

14001–14100 

|-bgcolor=#fefefe
| 14001 || 1993 KR || — || May 26, 1993 || Kiyosato || S. Otomo || — || align=right | 4.4 km || 
|-id=002 bgcolor=#fefefe
| 14002 ||  || — || June 15, 1993 || Palomar || H. E. Holt || — || align=right | 4.7 km || 
|-id=003 bgcolor=#E9E9E9
| 14003 ||  || — || July 20, 1993 || La Silla || E. W. Elst || — || align=right | 2.6 km || 
|-id=004 bgcolor=#E9E9E9
| 14004 Chikama ||  ||  || September 19, 1993 || Kitami || K. Endate, K. Watanabe || — || align=right | 7.8 km || 
|-id=005 bgcolor=#d6d6d6
| 14005 ||  || — || September 22, 1993 || Mérida || O. A. Naranjo || — || align=right | 18 km || 
|-id=006 bgcolor=#E9E9E9
| 14006 Sakamotofumio ||  ||  || September 18, 1993 || Kitami || K. Endate, K. Watanabe || — || align=right | 11 km || 
|-id=007 bgcolor=#E9E9E9
| 14007 ||  || — || October 9, 1993 || La Silla || E. W. Elst || — || align=right | 5.2 km || 
|-id=008 bgcolor=#E9E9E9
| 14008 ||  || — || October 9, 1993 || La Silla || E. W. Elst || AST || align=right | 6.4 km || 
|-id=009 bgcolor=#E9E9E9
| 14009 ||  || — || October 13, 1993 || Palomar || H. E. Holt || — || align=right | 13 km || 
|-id=010 bgcolor=#E9E9E9
| 14010 Jomonaomori || 1993 UL ||  || October 16, 1993 || Kitami || K. Endate, K. Watanabe || EUN || align=right | 4.0 km || 
|-id=011 bgcolor=#E9E9E9
| 14011 || 1993 US || — || October 22, 1993 || Oohira || T. Urata || HEN || align=right | 4.4 km || 
|-id=012 bgcolor=#d6d6d6
| 14012 Amedee || 1993 XG ||  || December 6, 1993 || Geisei || T. Seki || SAN || align=right | 11 km || 
|-id=013 bgcolor=#d6d6d6
| 14013 || 1993 YF || — || December 17, 1993 || Oizumi || T. Kobayashi || THM || align=right | 7.4 km || 
|-id=014 bgcolor=#d6d6d6
| 14014 Münchhausen ||  ||  || January 14, 1994 || Tautenburg Observatory || F. Börngen || EOS || align=right | 8.6 km || 
|-id=015 bgcolor=#d6d6d6
| 14015 Senancour ||  ||  || January 16, 1994 || Caussols || E. W. Elst, C. Pollas || HYG || align=right | 9.6 km || 
|-id=016 bgcolor=#d6d6d6
| 14016 Steller ||  ||  || January 16, 1994 || Caussols || E. W. Elst, C. Pollas || EOS || align=right | 7.5 km || 
|-id=017 bgcolor=#FA8072
| 14017 || 1994 NS || — || July 4, 1994 || Nachi-Katsuura || Y. Shimizu, T. Urata || — || align=right | 3.2 km || 
|-id=018 bgcolor=#fefefe
| 14018 ||  || — || August 10, 1994 || La Silla || E. W. Elst || NYS || align=right | 1.9 km || 
|-id=019 bgcolor=#fefefe
| 14019 Pourbus ||  ||  || August 10, 1994 || La Silla || E. W. Elst || — || align=right | 2.1 km || 
|-id=020 bgcolor=#fefefe
| 14020 ||  || — || August 10, 1994 || La Silla || E. W. Elst || — || align=right | 2.5 km || 
|-id=021 bgcolor=#fefefe
| 14021 ||  || — || August 12, 1994 || La Silla || E. W. Elst || NYS || align=right | 1.9 km || 
|-id=022 bgcolor=#fefefe
| 14022 ||  || — || August 12, 1994 || La Silla || E. W. Elst || — || align=right | 3.1 km || 
|-id=023 bgcolor=#fefefe
| 14023 ||  || — || August 12, 1994 || La Silla || E. W. Elst || V || align=right | 3.5 km || 
|-id=024 bgcolor=#E9E9E9
| 14024 Procol Harum || 1994 RZ ||  || September 9, 1994 || Sormano || P. Sicoli, P. Ghezzi || — || align=right | 3.9 km || 
|-id=025 bgcolor=#E9E9E9
| 14025 Fallada ||  ||  || September 2, 1994 || Tautenburg Observatory || F. Börngen || — || align=right | 4.5 km || 
|-id=026 bgcolor=#fefefe
| 14026 Esquerdo ||  ||  || September 28, 1994 || Kitt Peak || Spacewatch || NYS || align=right | 4.4 km || 
|-id=027 bgcolor=#E9E9E9
| 14027 Ichimoto ||  ||  || October 2, 1994 || Kitami || K. Endate, K. Watanabe || — || align=right | 3.0 km || 
|-id=028 bgcolor=#E9E9E9
| 14028 Nakamurahiroshi ||  ||  || October 5, 1994 || Kitami || K. Endate, K. Watanabe || — || align=right | 4.2 km || 
|-id=029 bgcolor=#fefefe
| 14029 ||  || — || October 31, 1994 || Nachi-Katsuura || Y. Shimizu, T. Urata || — || align=right | 4.6 km || 
|-id=030 bgcolor=#E9E9E9
| 14030 ||  || — || October 25, 1994 || Kushiro || S. Ueda, H. Kaneda || EUN || align=right | 4.2 km || 
|-id=031 bgcolor=#E9E9E9
| 14031 Rozyo ||  ||  || November 26, 1994 || Kitami || K. Endate, K. Watanabe || EUN || align=right | 7.4 km || 
|-id=032 bgcolor=#E9E9E9
| 14032 Mego || 1994 XP ||  || December 4, 1994 || Ayashi Station || M. Koishikawa || RAF || align=right | 4.5 km || 
|-id=033 bgcolor=#E9E9E9
| 14033 || 1994 YR || — || December 28, 1994 || Oizumi || T. Kobayashi || — || align=right | 8.2 km || 
|-id=034 bgcolor=#E9E9E9
| 14034 || 1995 BW || — || January 25, 1995 || Oizumi || T. Kobayashi || — || align=right | 5.2 km || 
|-id=035 bgcolor=#d6d6d6
| 14035 || 1995 CJ || — || February 1, 1995 || Oizumi || T. Kobayashi || — || align=right | 13 km || 
|-id=036 bgcolor=#E9E9E9
| 14036 Yasuhirotoyama ||  ||  || March 5, 1995 || Nyukasa || M. Hirasawa, S. Suzuki || — || align=right | 6.9 km || 
|-id=037 bgcolor=#d6d6d6
| 14037 Takakikasahara ||  ||  || March 5, 1995 || Nyukasa || M. Hirasawa, S. Suzuki || — || align=right | 13 km || 
|-id=038 bgcolor=#d6d6d6
| 14038 || 1995 HR || — || April 27, 1995 || Kushiro || S. Ueda, H. Kaneda || — || align=right | 7.9 km || 
|-id=039 bgcolor=#d6d6d6
| 14039 ||  || — || May 28, 1995 || Palomar || E. F. Helin || — || align=right | 19 km || 
|-id=040 bgcolor=#fefefe
| 14040 Andrejka ||  ||  || August 23, 1995 || Modra || A. Galád, A. Pravda || slow || align=right | 2.2 km || 
|-id=041 bgcolor=#fefefe
| 14041 Dürrenmatt ||  ||  || September 21, 1995 || Tautenburg Observatory || F. Börngen || — || align=right | 3.1 km || 
|-id=042 bgcolor=#fefefe
| 14042 Agafonov ||  ||  || October 16, 1995 || Zelenchukskaya || T. V. Kryachko || — || align=right | 2.6 km || 
|-id=043 bgcolor=#fefefe
| 14043 ||  || — || October 20, 1995 || Uenohara || N. Kawasato || — || align=right | 3.0 km || 
|-id=044 bgcolor=#fefefe
| 14044 ||  || — || November 1, 1995 || Kiyosato || S. Otomo || V || align=right | 4.1 km || 
|-id=045 bgcolor=#fefefe
| 14045 ||  || — || November 4, 1995 || Xinglong || SCAP || — || align=right | 3.8 km || 
|-id=046 bgcolor=#fefefe
| 14046 Keikai ||  ||  || November 17, 1995 || Nanyo || T. Okuni || FLO || align=right | 2.6 km || 
|-id=047 bgcolor=#fefefe
| 14047 Kohichiro ||  ||  || November 18, 1995 || Kitami || K. Endate, K. Watanabe || V || align=right | 3.0 km || 
|-id=048 bgcolor=#fefefe
| 14048 ||  || — || November 27, 1995 || Oizumi || T. Kobayashi || — || align=right | 2.8 km || 
|-id=049 bgcolor=#fefefe
| 14049 ||  || — || December 15, 1995 || Oizumi || T. Kobayashi || FLO || align=right | 3.6 km || 
|-id=050 bgcolor=#fefefe
| 14050 ||  || — || December 21, 1995 || Oizumi || T. Kobayashi || — || align=right | 4.5 km || 
|-id=051 bgcolor=#fefefe
| 14051 ||  || — || December 21, 1995 || Oizumi || T. Kobayashi || FLO || align=right | 4.1 km || 
|-id=052 bgcolor=#fefefe
| 14052 ||  || — || December 27, 1995 || Oizumi || T. Kobayashi || — || align=right | 2.6 km || 
|-id=053 bgcolor=#fefefe
| 14053 ||  || — || December 27, 1995 || Bergisch Gladbach || W. Bickel || — || align=right | 1.5 km || 
|-id=054 bgcolor=#fefefe
| 14054 Dušek || 1996 AR ||  || January 12, 1996 || Kleť || M. Tichý, Z. Moravec || — || align=right | 4.9 km || 
|-id=055 bgcolor=#fefefe
| 14055 || 1996 AS || — || January 10, 1996 || Oizumi || T. Kobayashi || — || align=right | 3.4 km || 
|-id=056 bgcolor=#fefefe
| 14056 Kainar ||  ||  || January 13, 1996 || Kleť || Kleť Obs. || — || align=right | 3.0 km || 
|-id=057 bgcolor=#fefefe
| 14057 Manfredstoll ||  ||  || January 15, 1996 || Linz || E. Meyer, E. Obermair || MAS || align=right | 2.2 km || 
|-id=058 bgcolor=#fefefe
| 14058 ||  || — || January 14, 1996 || Xinglong || SCAP || — || align=right | 3.8 km || 
|-id=059 bgcolor=#fefefe
| 14059 ||  || — || January 25, 1996 || Oizumi || T. Kobayashi || — || align=right | 4.7 km || 
|-id=060 bgcolor=#fefefe
| 14060 Patersonewen ||  ||  || January 18, 1996 || Kitt Peak || Spacewatch || — || align=right | 4.0 km || 
|-id=061 bgcolor=#fefefe
| 14061 Nagincox ||  ||  || February 13, 1996 || Cima Ekar || U. Munari, M. Tombelli || V || align=right | 2.9 km || 
|-id=062 bgcolor=#fefefe
| 14062 Cremaschini ||  ||  || February 14, 1996 || Cima Ekar || M. Tombelli, U. Munari || NYS || align=right | 2.9 km || 
|-id=063 bgcolor=#fefefe
| 14063 || 1996 DZ || — || February 21, 1996 || Oizumi || T. Kobayashi || — || align=right | 7.2 km || 
|-id=064 bgcolor=#fefefe
| 14064 ||  || — || February 16, 1996 || Caussols || E. W. Elst || — || align=right | 3.0 km || 
|-id=065 bgcolor=#E9E9E9
| 14065 Flegel ||  ||  || March 11, 1996 || Kitt Peak || Spacewatch || — || align=right | 2.5 km || 
|-id=066 bgcolor=#E9E9E9
| 14066 ||  || — || March 20, 1996 || Haleakala || AMOS || EUN || align=right | 5.4 km || 
|-id=067 bgcolor=#d6d6d6
| 14067 ||  || — || April 15, 1996 || La Silla || E. W. Elst || KOR || align=right | 4.0 km || 
|-id=068 bgcolor=#E9E9E9
| 14068 Hauserová ||  ||  || April 21, 1996 || Kleť || J. Tichá, M. Tichý || ADE || align=right | 4.9 km || 
|-id=069 bgcolor=#d6d6d6
| 14069 Krasheninnikov ||  ||  || April 18, 1996 || La Silla || E. W. Elst || — || align=right | 8.3 km || 
|-id=070 bgcolor=#d6d6d6
| 14070 ||  || — || May 14, 1996 || Haleakala || NEAT || — || align=right | 13 km || 
|-id=071 bgcolor=#d6d6d6
| 14071 Gadabird ||  ||  || May 11, 1996 || Kitt Peak || Spacewatch || KOR || align=right | 5.5 km || 
|-id=072 bgcolor=#d6d6d6
| 14072 Volterra || 1996 KN ||  || May 21, 1996 || Prescott || P. G. Comba || THM || align=right | 12 km || 
|-id=073 bgcolor=#fefefe
| 14073 ||  || — || May 17, 1996 || Xinglong || SCAP || — || align=right | 3.7 km || 
|-id=074 bgcolor=#d6d6d6
| 14074 Riccati || 1996 NS ||  || July 11, 1996 || Bologna || San Vittore Obs. || — || align=right | 11 km || 
|-id=075 bgcolor=#d6d6d6
| 14075 Kenwill || 1996 OJ ||  || July 18, 1996 || Rand || G. R. Viscome || THM || align=right | 10 km || 
|-id=076 bgcolor=#d6d6d6
| 14076 ||  || — || July 20, 1996 || Xinglong || SCAP || EMA || align=right | 14 km || 
|-id=077 bgcolor=#d6d6d6
| 14077 Volfango ||  ||  || August 9, 1996 || Stroncone || A. Vagnozzi || HYG || align=right | 10 km || 
|-id=078 bgcolor=#fefefe
| 14078 ||  || — || March 31, 1997 || Socorro || LINEAR || — || align=right | 2.6 km || 
|-id=079 bgcolor=#fefefe
| 14079 ||  || — || March 31, 1997 || Socorro || LINEAR || V || align=right | 2.3 km || 
|-id=080 bgcolor=#fefefe
| 14080 Heppenheim || 1997 GB ||  || April 1, 1997 || Starkenburg Observatory || Starkenburg Obs. || — || align=right | 3.0 km || 
|-id=081 bgcolor=#fefefe
| 14081 ||  || — || April 3, 1997 || Socorro || LINEAR || — || align=right | 2.5 km || 
|-id=082 bgcolor=#fefefe
| 14082 ||  || — || April 6, 1997 || Socorro || LINEAR || — || align=right | 4.4 km || 
|-id=083 bgcolor=#fefefe
| 14083 ||  || — || April 6, 1997 || Socorro || LINEAR || — || align=right | 3.6 km || 
|-id=084 bgcolor=#fefefe
| 14084 ||  || — || April 6, 1997 || Socorro || LINEAR || — || align=right | 8.0 km || 
|-id=085 bgcolor=#fefefe
| 14085 ||  || — || April 3, 1997 || Socorro || LINEAR || — || align=right | 2.1 km || 
|-id=086 bgcolor=#fefefe
| 14086 ||  || — || April 6, 1997 || Socorro || LINEAR || — || align=right | 2.2 km || 
|-id=087 bgcolor=#fefefe
| 14087 ||  || — || April 30, 1997 || Socorro || LINEAR || — || align=right | 2.1 km || 
|-id=088 bgcolor=#fefefe
| 14088 Ancus ||  ||  || May 3, 1997 || Colleverde || V. S. Casulli || NYS || align=right | 2.0 km || 
|-id=089 bgcolor=#E9E9E9
| 14089 ||  || — || May 8, 1997 || Xinglong || SCAP || — || align=right | 4.7 km || 
|-id=090 bgcolor=#E9E9E9
| 14090 ||  || — || June 28, 1997 || Socorro || LINEAR || — || align=right | 3.1 km || 
|-id=091 bgcolor=#E9E9E9
| 14091 ||  || — || June 28, 1997 || Socorro || LINEAR || EUN || align=right | 5.3 km || 
|-id=092 bgcolor=#E9E9E9
| 14092 Gaily ||  ||  || June 29, 1997 || Kitt Peak || Spacewatch || HEN || align=right | 2.9 km || 
|-id=093 bgcolor=#d6d6d6
| 14093 || 1997 OM || — || July 26, 1997 || Rand || G. R. Viscome || KOR || align=right | 3.7 km || 
|-id=094 bgcolor=#d6d6d6
| 14094 Garneau ||  ||  || July 28, 1997 || Kitt Peak || Spacewatch || — || align=right | 3.9 km || 
|-id=095 bgcolor=#E9E9E9
| 14095 ||  || — || August 7, 1997 || Lake Clear || K. A. Williams || — || align=right | 5.6 km || 
|-id=096 bgcolor=#E9E9E9
| 14096 ||  || — || August 4, 1997 || Črni Vrh || H. Mikuž || — || align=right | 3.3 km || 
|-id=097 bgcolor=#E9E9E9
| 14097 Capdepera ||  ||  || August 11, 1997 || Majorca || Á. López J., R. Pacheco || — || align=right | 7.7 km || 
|-id=098 bgcolor=#d6d6d6
| 14098 Šimek || 1997 QS ||  || August 24, 1997 || Modra || A. Galád, A. Pravda || KOR || align=right | 7.4 km || 
|-id=099 bgcolor=#d6d6d6
| 14099 ||  || — || September 5, 1997 || Nachi-Katsuura || Y. Shimizu, T. Urata || THM || align=right | 11 km || 
|-id=100 bgcolor=#d6d6d6
| 14100 Weierstrass ||  ||  || September 8, 1997 || Prescott || P. G. Comba || THM || align=right | 9.7 km || 
|}

14101–14200 

|-bgcolor=#E9E9E9
| 14101 ||  || — || September 19, 1997 || Xinglong || SCAP || ADE || align=right | 9.5 km || 
|-id=102 bgcolor=#fefefe
| 14102 ||  || — || September 29, 1997 || Nachi-Katsuura || Y. Shimizu, T. Urata || NYS || align=right | 3.5 km || 
|-id=103 bgcolor=#d6d6d6
| 14103 Manzoni || 1997 TC ||  || October 1, 1997 || Sormano || P. Sicoli, A. Testa || KOR || align=right | 4.6 km || 
|-id=104 bgcolor=#d6d6d6
| 14104 Delpino || 1997 TV ||  || October 2, 1997 || Sormano || V. Giuliani || VER || align=right | 11 km || 
|-id=105 bgcolor=#d6d6d6
| 14105 Nakadai ||  ||  || October 6, 1997 || Kitami || K. Endate, K. Watanabe || EOS || align=right | 9.3 km || 
|-id=106 bgcolor=#E9E9E9
| 14106 ||  || — || October 27, 1997 || Bergisch Gladbach || W. Bickel || — || align=right | 6.8 km || 
|-id=107 bgcolor=#d6d6d6
| 14107 ||  || — || November 8, 1997 || Oizumi || T. Kobayashi || — || align=right | 8.2 km || 
|-id=108 bgcolor=#fefefe
| 14108 ||  || — || July 26, 1998 || La Silla || E. W. Elst || — || align=right | 4.7 km || 
|-id=109 bgcolor=#E9E9E9
| 14109 ||  || — || July 26, 1998 || La Silla || E. W. Elst || — || align=right | 5.4 km || 
|-id=110 bgcolor=#fefefe
| 14110 ||  || — || August 17, 1998 || Socorro || LINEAR || NYS || align=right | 2.7 km || 
|-id=111 bgcolor=#fefefe
| 14111 Kimamos ||  ||  || August 17, 1998 || Socorro || LINEAR || — || align=right | 2.4 km || 
|-id=112 bgcolor=#fefefe
| 14112 ||  || — || August 25, 1998 || Višnjan Observatory || Višnjan Obs. || NYS || align=right | 4.3 km || 
|-id=113 bgcolor=#d6d6d6
| 14113 ||  || — || August 17, 1998 || Socorro || LINEAR || — || align=right | 12 km || 
|-id=114 bgcolor=#fefefe
| 14114 Randyray ||  ||  || August 17, 1998 || Socorro || LINEAR || NYS || align=right | 4.6 km || 
|-id=115 bgcolor=#fefefe
| 14115 Melaas ||  ||  || August 17, 1998 || Socorro || LINEAR || — || align=right | 2.7 km || 
|-id=116 bgcolor=#fefefe
| 14116 Ogea ||  ||  || August 17, 1998 || Socorro || LINEAR || NYS || align=right | 3.1 km || 
|-id=117 bgcolor=#fefefe
| 14117 ||  || — || August 17, 1998 || Socorro || LINEAR || — || align=right | 2.3 km || 
|-id=118 bgcolor=#E9E9E9
| 14118 ||  || — || August 17, 1998 || Socorro || LINEAR || EUN || align=right | 4.4 km || 
|-id=119 bgcolor=#fefefe
| 14119 Johnprince ||  ||  || August 17, 1998 || Socorro || LINEAR || V || align=right | 2.9 km || 
|-id=120 bgcolor=#fefefe
| 14120 Espenak ||  ||  || August 27, 1998 || Anderson Mesa || LONEOS || V || align=right | 13 km || 
|-id=121 bgcolor=#fefefe
| 14121 Stüwe ||  ||  || August 27, 1998 || Anderson Mesa || LONEOS || FLO || align=right | 3.7 km || 
|-id=122 bgcolor=#fefefe
| 14122 Josties ||  ||  || August 27, 1998 || Anderson Mesa || LONEOS || — || align=right | 3.0 km || 
|-id=123 bgcolor=#fefefe
| 14123 ||  || — || August 29, 1998 || Višnjan Observatory || Višnjan Obs. || FLO || align=right | 2.9 km || 
|-id=124 bgcolor=#E9E9E9
| 14124 Kamil ||  ||  || August 28, 1998 || Ondřejov || L. Kotková || — || align=right | 3.5 km || 
|-id=125 bgcolor=#E9E9E9
| 14125 ||  || — || August 27, 1998 || Xinglong || SCAP || — || align=right | 10 km || 
|-id=126 bgcolor=#E9E9E9
| 14126 ||  || — || August 28, 1998 || Socorro || LINEAR || — || align=right | 3.7 km || 
|-id=127 bgcolor=#E9E9E9
| 14127 ||  || — || August 28, 1998 || Socorro || LINEAR || EUN || align=right | 6.1 km || 
|-id=128 bgcolor=#E9E9E9
| 14128 ||  || — || August 28, 1998 || Socorro || LINEAR || GEF || align=right | 5.7 km || 
|-id=129 bgcolor=#fefefe
| 14129 Dibucci ||  ||  || August 19, 1998 || Socorro || LINEAR || — || align=right | 3.4 km || 
|-id=130 bgcolor=#fefefe
| 14130 ||  || — || August 26, 1998 || La Silla || E. W. Elst || — || align=right | 3.7 km || 
|-id=131 bgcolor=#fefefe
| 14131 ||  || — || August 25, 1998 || La Silla || E. W. Elst || FLO || align=right | 2.6 km || 
|-id=132 bgcolor=#fefefe
| 14132 ||  || — || August 25, 1998 || La Silla || E. W. Elst || — || align=right | 2.9 km || 
|-id=133 bgcolor=#fefefe
| 14133 ||  || — || September 14, 1998 || Socorro || LINEAR || — || align=right | 3.5 km || 
|-id=134 bgcolor=#E9E9E9
| 14134 Penkala ||  ||  || September 14, 1998 || Socorro || LINEAR || — || align=right | 3.3 km || 
|-id=135 bgcolor=#fefefe
| 14135 Cynthialang ||  ||  || September 14, 1998 || Socorro || LINEAR || NYS || align=right | 2.3 km || 
|-id=136 bgcolor=#fefefe
| 14136 ||  || — || September 14, 1998 || Socorro || LINEAR || — || align=right | 4.2 km || 
|-id=137 bgcolor=#E9E9E9
| 14137 ||  || — || September 14, 1998 || Socorro || LINEAR || — || align=right | 8.3 km || 
|-id=138 bgcolor=#fefefe
| 14138 ||  || — || September 14, 1998 || Socorro || LINEAR || NYS || align=right | 2.8 km || 
|-id=139 bgcolor=#d6d6d6
| 14139 ||  || — || September 14, 1998 || Socorro || LINEAR || — || align=right | 6.7 km || 
|-id=140 bgcolor=#E9E9E9
| 14140 ||  || — || September 14, 1998 || Socorro || LINEAR || — || align=right | 2.9 km || 
|-id=141 bgcolor=#fefefe
| 14141 Demeautis ||  ||  || September 16, 1998 || Caussols || ODAS || — || align=right | 3.3 km || 
|-id=142 bgcolor=#fefefe
| 14142 ||  || — || September 17, 1998 || Caussols || ODAS || — || align=right | 4.3 km || 
|-id=143 bgcolor=#fefefe
| 14143 Hadfield ||  ||  || September 18, 1998 || Kitt Peak || Spacewatch || V || align=right | 2.6 km || 
|-id=144 bgcolor=#E9E9E9
| 14144 ||  || — || September 23, 1998 || Višnjan Observatory || Višnjan Obs. || DOR || align=right | 8.5 km || 
|-id=145 bgcolor=#fefefe
| 14145 Sciam ||  ||  || September 17, 1998 || Anderson Mesa || LONEOS || — || align=right | 2.5 km || 
|-id=146 bgcolor=#fefefe
| 14146 Hughmaclean ||  ||  || September 28, 1998 || Kitt Peak || Spacewatch || — || align=right | 2.8 km || 
|-id=147 bgcolor=#fefefe
| 14147 Wenlingshuguang ||  ||  || September 23, 1998 || Xinglong || SCAP || — || align=right | 4.5 km || 
|-id=148 bgcolor=#fefefe
| 14148 Jimchamberlin ||  ||  || September 25, 1998 || Kitt Peak || Spacewatch || — || align=right | 1.9 km || 
|-id=149 bgcolor=#fefefe
| 14149 Yakowitz ||  ||  || September 17, 1998 || Anderson Mesa || LONEOS || V || align=right | 3.8 km || 
|-id=150 bgcolor=#fefefe
| 14150 ||  || — || September 20, 1998 || La Silla || E. W. Elst || NYS || align=right | 3.5 km || 
|-id=151 bgcolor=#fefefe
| 14151 ||  || — || September 21, 1998 || La Silla || E. W. Elst || NYS || align=right | 2.4 km || 
|-id=152 bgcolor=#fefefe
| 14152 ||  || — || September 21, 1998 || La Silla || E. W. Elst || V || align=right | 2.0 km || 
|-id=153 bgcolor=#fefefe
| 14153 Dianecaplain ||  ||  || September 26, 1998 || Socorro || LINEAR || — || align=right | 1.9 km || 
|-id=154 bgcolor=#E9E9E9
| 14154 Negrelli ||  ||  || September 26, 1998 || Socorro || LINEAR || — || align=right | 5.0 km || 
|-id=155 bgcolor=#fefefe
| 14155 Cibronen ||  ||  || September 26, 1998 || Socorro || LINEAR || FLO || align=right | 3.7 km || 
|-id=156 bgcolor=#E9E9E9
| 14156 ||  || — || September 26, 1998 || Socorro || LINEAR || — || align=right | 3.8 km || 
|-id=157 bgcolor=#fefefe
| 14157 Pamelasobey ||  ||  || September 26, 1998 || Socorro || LINEAR || — || align=right | 4.1 km || 
|-id=158 bgcolor=#fefefe
| 14158 Alananderson ||  ||  || September 26, 1998 || Socorro || LINEAR || V || align=right | 5.4 km || 
|-id=159 bgcolor=#fefefe
| 14159 ||  || — || September 26, 1998 || Socorro || LINEAR || — || align=right | 1.8 km || 
|-id=160 bgcolor=#E9E9E9
| 14160 ||  || — || September 18, 1998 || La Silla || E. W. Elst || — || align=right | 1.9 km || 
|-id=161 bgcolor=#fefefe
| 14161 ||  || — || September 20, 1998 || La Silla || E. W. Elst || — || align=right | 3.5 km || 
|-id=162 bgcolor=#fefefe
| 14162 ||  || — || October 14, 1998 || Višnjan Observatory || K. Korlević || — || align=right | 6.1 km || 
|-id=163 bgcolor=#d6d6d6
| 14163 Johnchapman ||  ||  || October 13, 1998 || Kitt Peak || Spacewatch || — || align=right | 6.4 km || 
|-id=164 bgcolor=#d6d6d6
| 14164 Hennigar ||  ||  || October 15, 1998 || Kitt Peak || Spacewatch || KOR || align=right | 4.0 km || 
|-id=165 bgcolor=#E9E9E9
| 14165 || 1998 UZ || — || October 19, 1998 || Zeno || T. Stafford || MIT || align=right | 10 km || 
|-id=166 bgcolor=#E9E9E9
| 14166 ||  || — || October 21, 1998 || Višnjan Observatory || K. Korlević || — || align=right | 4.7 km || 
|-id=167 bgcolor=#d6d6d6
| 14167 ||  || — || October 24, 1998 || Oizumi || T. Kobayashi || THM || align=right | 11 km || 
|-id=168 bgcolor=#d6d6d6
| 14168 ||  || — || October 23, 1998 || Višnjan Observatory || K. Korlević || THM || align=right | 13 km || 
|-id=169 bgcolor=#E9E9E9
| 14169 ||  || — || October 25, 1998 || Woomera || F. B. Zoltowski || MRX || align=right | 4.7 km || 
|-id=170 bgcolor=#d6d6d6
| 14170 ||  || — || November 11, 1998 || Nachi-Katsuura || Y. Shimizu, T. Urata || HYG || align=right | 10 km || 
|-id=171 bgcolor=#E9E9E9
| 14171 ||  || — || November 11, 1998 || Nachi-Katsuura || Y. Shimizu, T. Urata || — || align=right | 14 km || 
|-id=172 bgcolor=#fefefe
| 14172 Amanolivere ||  ||  || November 10, 1998 || Socorro || LINEAR || — || align=right | 3.4 km || 
|-id=173 bgcolor=#fefefe
| 14173 ||  || — || November 10, 1998 || Socorro || LINEAR || — || align=right | 3.9 km || 
|-id=174 bgcolor=#d6d6d6
| 14174 Deborahsmall ||  ||  || November 10, 1998 || Socorro || LINEAR || — || align=right | 3.4 km || 
|-id=175 bgcolor=#d6d6d6
| 14175 ||  || — || November 10, 1998 || Socorro || LINEAR || — || align=right | 13 km || 
|-id=176 bgcolor=#d6d6d6
| 14176 ||  || — || November 10, 1998 || Socorro || LINEAR || HYG || align=right | 8.9 km || 
|-id=177 bgcolor=#E9E9E9
| 14177 ||  || — || November 10, 1998 || Socorro || LINEAR || — || align=right | 4.6 km || 
|-id=178 bgcolor=#d6d6d6
| 14178 ||  || — || November 10, 1998 || Socorro || LINEAR || KOR || align=right | 4.5 km || 
|-id=179 bgcolor=#fefefe
| 14179 Skinner ||  ||  || November 15, 1998 || Cocoa || I. P. Griffin || — || align=right | 8.5 km || 
|-id=180 bgcolor=#d6d6d6
| 14180 ||  || — || November 20, 1998 || Oizumi || T. Kobayashi || — || align=right | 8.5 km || 
|-id=181 bgcolor=#E9E9E9
| 14181 Koromházi ||  ||  || November 20, 1998 || Piszkéstető || K. Sárneczky, L. Kiss || — || align=right | 11 km || 
|-id=182 bgcolor=#fefefe
| 14182 Alley ||  ||  || November 21, 1998 || Socorro || LINEAR || V || align=right | 2.3 km || 
|-id=183 bgcolor=#d6d6d6
| 14183 ||  || — || November 21, 1998 || Socorro || LINEAR || — || align=right | 8.4 km || 
|-id=184 bgcolor=#d6d6d6
| 14184 ||  || — || November 21, 1998 || Socorro || LINEAR || KOR || align=right | 5.9 km || 
|-id=185 bgcolor=#E9E9E9
| 14185 Van Ness ||  ||  || November 21, 1998 || Anderson Mesa || LONEOS || — || align=right | 5.4 km || 
|-id=186 bgcolor=#d6d6d6
| 14186 Virgiliofos ||  ||  || December 7, 1998 || Pian dei Termini || A. Boattini, L. Tesi || — || align=right | 12 km || 
|-id=187 bgcolor=#fefefe
| 14187 ||  || — || December 14, 1998 || Višnjan Observatory || K. Korlević || — || align=right | 4.1 km || 
|-id=188 bgcolor=#d6d6d6
| 14188 ||  || — || December 13, 1998 || Oizumi || T. Kobayashi || EOS || align=right | 6.8 km || 
|-id=189 bgcolor=#E9E9E9
| 14189 Sèvre ||  ||  || December 15, 1998 || Caussols || ODAS || — || align=right | 6.3 km || 
|-id=190 bgcolor=#d6d6d6
| 14190 Soldán ||  ||  || December 15, 1998 || Kleť || M. Tichý, Z. Moravec || — || align=right | 13 km || 
|-id=191 bgcolor=#fefefe
| 14191 ||  || — || December 14, 1998 || Socorro || LINEAR || FLO || align=right | 3.8 km || 
|-id=192 bgcolor=#d6d6d6
| 14192 ||  || — || December 14, 1998 || Socorro || LINEAR || EOS || align=right | 8.5 km || 
|-id=193 bgcolor=#d6d6d6
| 14193 ||  || — || December 14, 1998 || Socorro || LINEAR || — || align=right | 8.6 km || 
|-id=194 bgcolor=#d6d6d6
| 14194 ||  || — || December 14, 1998 || Socorro || LINEAR || — || align=right | 12 km || 
|-id=195 bgcolor=#d6d6d6
| 14195 ||  || — || December 14, 1998 || Socorro || LINEAR || HIL3:2 || align=right | 21 km || 
|-id=196 bgcolor=#fefefe
| 14196 ||  || — || December 15, 1998 || Socorro || LINEAR || — || align=right | 4.5 km || 
|-id=197 bgcolor=#d6d6d6
| 14197 ||  || — || December 14, 1998 || Socorro || LINEAR || — || align=right | 8.1 km || 
|-id=198 bgcolor=#E9E9E9
| 14198 ||  || — || December 14, 1998 || Socorro || LINEAR || — || align=right | 16 km || 
|-id=199 bgcolor=#fefefe
| 14199 ||  || — || December 15, 1998 || Socorro || LINEAR || — || align=right | 9.0 km || 
|-id=200 bgcolor=#fefefe
| 14200 ||  || — || December 15, 1998 || Socorro || LINEAR || — || align=right | 5.5 km || 
|}

14201–14300 

|-bgcolor=#E9E9E9
| 14201 ||  || — || December 15, 1998 || Socorro || LINEAR || EUN || align=right | 8.1 km || 
|-id=202 bgcolor=#E9E9E9
| 14202 ||  || — || December 17, 1998 || Oizumi || T. Kobayashi || RAF || align=right | 5.8 km || 
|-id=203 bgcolor=#d6d6d6
| 14203 Hocking ||  ||  || December 25, 1998 || Kitt Peak || Spacewatch || — || align=right | 9.3 km || 
|-id=204 bgcolor=#d6d6d6
| 14204 ||  || — || January 12, 1999 || Woomera || F. B. Zoltowski || EOS || align=right | 9.6 km || 
|-id=205 bgcolor=#d6d6d6
| 14205 ||  || — || January 18, 1999 || Gekko || T. Kagawa || — || align=right | 8.2 km || 
|-id=206 bgcolor=#d6d6d6
| 14206 Sehnal ||  ||  || February 15, 1999 || Kleť || M. Tichý, Z. Moravec || — || align=right | 15 km || 
|-id=207 bgcolor=#d6d6d6
| 14207 ||  || — || February 10, 1999 || Socorro || LINEAR || EOS || align=right | 12 km || 
|-id=208 bgcolor=#E9E9E9
| 14208 ||  || — || February 12, 1999 || Socorro || LINEAR || — || align=right | 19 km || 
|-id=209 bgcolor=#fefefe
| 14209 ||  || — || February 12, 1999 || Socorro || LINEAR || — || align=right | 3.0 km || 
|-id=210 bgcolor=#E9E9E9
| 14210 ||  || — || February 10, 1999 || Socorro || LINEAR || — || align=right | 6.0 km || 
|-id=211 bgcolor=#FA8072
| 14211 ||  || — || July 12, 1999 || Socorro || LINEAR || — || align=right | 4.8 km || 
|-id=212 bgcolor=#E9E9E9
| 14212 ||  || — || July 14, 1999 || Socorro || LINEAR || — || align=right | 3.4 km || 
|-id=213 bgcolor=#E9E9E9
| 14213 ||  || — || July 12, 1999 || Socorro || LINEAR || — || align=right | 13 km || 
|-id=214 bgcolor=#E9E9E9
| 14214 Hirsch ||  ||  || September 7, 1999 || Socorro || LINEAR || — || align=right | 2.9 km || 
|-id=215 bgcolor=#fefefe
| 14215 ||  || — || October 6, 1999 || Višnjan Observatory || K. Korlević, M. Jurić || — || align=right | 8.2 km || 
|-id=216 bgcolor=#E9E9E9
| 14216 ||  || — || November 4, 1999 || Gekko || T. Kagawa || — || align=right | 5.4 km || 
|-id=217 bgcolor=#fefefe
| 14217 Oaxaca ||  ||  || November 10, 1999 || Oaxaca || J. M. Roe || NYS || align=right | 1.7 km || 
|-id=218 bgcolor=#fefefe
| 14218 ||  || — || November 3, 1999 || Socorro || LINEAR || V || align=right | 3.2 km || 
|-id=219 bgcolor=#E9E9E9
| 14219 ||  || — || November 3, 1999 || Socorro || LINEAR || — || align=right | 5.2 km || 
|-id=220 bgcolor=#E9E9E9
| 14220 Alexgibbs ||  ||  || November 9, 1999 || Catalina || CSS || ADE || align=right | 21 km || 
|-id=221 bgcolor=#fefefe
| 14221 || 1999 WL || — || November 16, 1999 || Oizumi || T. Kobayashi || FLO || align=right | 3.5 km || 
|-id=222 bgcolor=#FA8072
| 14222 ||  || — || November 25, 1999 || Višnjan Observatory || K. Korlević || unusual || align=right | 6.7 km || 
|-id=223 bgcolor=#FA8072
| 14223 Dolby ||  ||  || December 3, 1999 || Fountain Hills || C. W. Juels || — || align=right | 3.3 km || 
|-id=224 bgcolor=#E9E9E9
| 14224 Gaede ||  ||  || December 6, 1999 || Socorro || LINEAR || — || align=right | 4.8 km || 
|-id=225 bgcolor=#fefefe
| 14225 Alisahamilton ||  ||  || December 7, 1999 || Socorro || LINEAR || NYS || align=right | 2.2 km || 
|-id=226 bgcolor=#E9E9E9
| 14226 Hamura ||  ||  || December 7, 1999 || Socorro || LINEAR || — || align=right | 2.7 km || 
|-id=227 bgcolor=#d6d6d6
| 14227 ||  || — || December 7, 1999 || Socorro || LINEAR || THM || align=right | 18 km || 
|-id=228 bgcolor=#E9E9E9
| 14228 ||  || — || December 7, 1999 || Socorro || LINEAR || — || align=right | 4.3 km || 
|-id=229 bgcolor=#fefefe
| 14229 ||  || — || December 7, 1999 || Socorro || LINEAR || FLO || align=right | 4.0 km || 
|-id=230 bgcolor=#fefefe
| 14230 Mariahines ||  ||  || December 7, 1999 || Socorro || LINEAR || FLO || align=right | 3.1 km || 
|-id=231 bgcolor=#d6d6d6
| 14231 ||  || — || December 7, 1999 || Socorro || LINEAR || — || align=right | 9.9 km || 
|-id=232 bgcolor=#E9E9E9
| 14232 Curtismiller ||  ||  || December 5, 1999 || Catalina || CSS || — || align=right | 6.0 km || 
|-id=233 bgcolor=#E9E9E9
| 14233 ||  || — || December 10, 1999 || Socorro || LINEAR || MAR || align=right | 7.0 km || 
|-id=234 bgcolor=#fefefe
| 14234 Davidhoover ||  ||  || December 12, 1999 || Socorro || LINEAR || — || align=right | 2.5 km || 
|-id=235 bgcolor=#C2FFFF
| 14235 ||  || — || December 12, 1999 || Socorro || LINEAR || L4 || align=right | 29 km || 
|-id=236 bgcolor=#E9E9E9
| 14236 ||  || — || December 12, 1999 || Socorro || LINEAR || — || align=right | 5.4 km || 
|-id=237 bgcolor=#d6d6d6
| 14237 ||  || — || December 31, 1999 || Oizumi || T. Kobayashi || — || align=right | 7.8 km || 
|-id=238 bgcolor=#E9E9E9
| 14238 d'Artagnan ||  ||  || December 31, 1999 || Fountain Hills || C. W. Juels || — || align=right | 7.1 km || 
|-id=239 bgcolor=#d6d6d6
| 14239 ||  || — || January 3, 2000 || Oizumi || T. Kobayashi || — || align=right | 9.6 km || 
|-id=240 bgcolor=#fefefe
| 14240 ||  || — || January 3, 2000 || Oizumi || T. Kobayashi || V || align=right | 2.7 km || 
|-id=241 bgcolor=#d6d6d6
| 14241 ||  || — || January 5, 2000 || Višnjan Observatory || K. Korlević || — || align=right | 15 km || 
|-id=242 bgcolor=#d6d6d6
| 14242 ||  || — || January 3, 2000 || Socorro || LINEAR || THM || align=right | 8.4 km || 
|-id=243 bgcolor=#d6d6d6
| 14243 ||  || — || January 3, 2000 || Socorro || LINEAR || KOR || align=right | 3.7 km || 
|-id=244 bgcolor=#E9E9E9
| 14244 Labnow ||  ||  || January 3, 2000 || Socorro || LINEAR || — || align=right | 3.5 km || 
|-id=245 bgcolor=#fefefe
| 14245 ||  || — || January 3, 2000 || Socorro || LINEAR || — || align=right | 4.9 km || 
|-id=246 bgcolor=#d6d6d6
| 14246 ||  || — || January 6, 2000 || Višnjan Observatory || K. Korlević || KOR || align=right | 6.8 km || 
|-id=247 bgcolor=#fefefe
| 14247 ||  || — || January 4, 2000 || Socorro || LINEAR || NYS || align=right | 3.3 km || 
|-id=248 bgcolor=#d6d6d6
| 14248 ||  || — || January 4, 2000 || Socorro || LINEAR || THM || align=right | 11 km || 
|-id=249 bgcolor=#d6d6d6
| 14249 ||  || — || January 4, 2000 || Socorro || LINEAR || — || align=right | 12 km || 
|-id=250 bgcolor=#fefefe
| 14250 Kathleenmartin ||  ||  || January 4, 2000 || Socorro || LINEAR || FLO || align=right | 2.8 km || 
|-id=251 bgcolor=#d6d6d6
| 14251 ||  || — || January 4, 2000 || Socorro || LINEAR || EOS || align=right | 8.2 km || 
|-id=252 bgcolor=#fefefe
| 14252 Audreymeyer ||  ||  || January 4, 2000 || Socorro || LINEAR || — || align=right | 2.3 km || 
|-id=253 bgcolor=#E9E9E9
| 14253 ||  || — || January 4, 2000 || Socorro || LINEAR || HEN || align=right | 4.7 km || 
|-id=254 bgcolor=#d6d6d6
| 14254 ||  || — || January 4, 2000 || Socorro || LINEAR || — || align=right | 15 km || 
|-id=255 bgcolor=#E9E9E9
| 14255 ||  || — || January 5, 2000 || Socorro || LINEAR || DOR || align=right | 13 km || 
|-id=256 bgcolor=#d6d6d6
| 14256 ||  || — || January 4, 2000 || Socorro || LINEAR || KOR || align=right | 5.2 km || 
|-id=257 bgcolor=#fefefe
| 14257 ||  || — || January 4, 2000 || Socorro || LINEAR || FLO || align=right | 7.2 km || 
|-id=258 bgcolor=#fefefe
| 14258 Katrinaminck ||  ||  || January 5, 2000 || Socorro || LINEAR || — || align=right | 5.6 km || 
|-id=259 bgcolor=#d6d6d6
| 14259 ||  || — || January 5, 2000 || Socorro || LINEAR || — || align=right | 14 km || 
|-id=260 bgcolor=#d6d6d6
| 14260 ||  || — || January 5, 2000 || Socorro || LINEAR || — || align=right | 8.6 km || 
|-id=261 bgcolor=#d6d6d6
| 14261 ||  || — || January 5, 2000 || Socorro || LINEAR || EOS || align=right | 8.5 km || 
|-id=262 bgcolor=#fefefe
| 14262 Kratzer ||  ||  || January 5, 2000 || Socorro || LINEAR || V || align=right | 2.9 km || 
|-id=263 bgcolor=#d6d6d6
| 14263 ||  || — || January 5, 2000 || Socorro || LINEAR || KOR || align=right | 6.9 km || 
|-id=264 bgcolor=#d6d6d6
| 14264 ||  || — || January 5, 2000 || Socorro || LINEAR || VER || align=right | 12 km || 
|-id=265 bgcolor=#d6d6d6
| 14265 ||  || — || January 5, 2000 || Socorro || LINEAR || HYG || align=right | 12 km || 
|-id=266 bgcolor=#E9E9E9
| 14266 ||  || — || January 5, 2000 || Socorro || LINEAR || — || align=right | 5.5 km || 
|-id=267 bgcolor=#fefefe
| 14267 Zook ||  ||  || January 6, 2000 || Anderson Mesa || LONEOS || — || align=right | 3.6 km || 
|-id=268 bgcolor=#C2FFFF
| 14268 ||  || — || January 3, 2000 || Socorro || LINEAR || L4 || align=right | 58 km || 
|-id=269 bgcolor=#E9E9E9
| 14269 ||  || — || January 7, 2000 || Socorro || LINEAR || GEF || align=right | 6.6 km || 
|-id=270 bgcolor=#E9E9E9
| 14270 ||  || — || January 8, 2000 || Socorro || LINEAR || — || align=right | 7.6 km || 
|-id=271 bgcolor=#d6d6d6
| 14271 ||  || — || January 4, 2000 || Socorro || LINEAR || KOR || align=right | 6.5 km || 
|-id=272 bgcolor=#d6d6d6
| 14272 ||  || — || January 5, 2000 || Socorro || LINEAR || 7:4 || align=right | 9.6 km || 
|-id=273 bgcolor=#E9E9E9
| 14273 ||  || — || January 31, 2000 || Oizumi || T. Kobayashi || — || align=right | 4.3 km || 
|-id=274 bgcolor=#d6d6d6
| 14274 Landstreet ||  ||  || January 29, 2000 || Kitt Peak || Spacewatch || URS || align=right | 21 km || 
|-id=275 bgcolor=#fefefe
| 14275 Dianemurray ||  ||  || January 30, 2000 || Socorro || LINEAR || — || align=right | 4.2 km || 
|-id=276 bgcolor=#fefefe
| 14276 ||  || — || February 2, 2000 || Oizumi || T. Kobayashi || FLO || align=right | 6.0 km || 
|-id=277 bgcolor=#E9E9E9
| 14277 Parsa ||  ||  || February 2, 2000 || Socorro || LINEAR || AGN || align=right | 2.9 km || 
|-id=278 bgcolor=#fefefe
| 14278 Perrenot ||  ||  || February 2, 2000 || Socorro || LINEAR || — || align=right | 2.4 km || 
|-id=279 bgcolor=#d6d6d6
| 14279 ||  || — || February 3, 2000 || Socorro || LINEAR || THM || align=right | 9.4 km || 
|-id=280 bgcolor=#d6d6d6
| 14280 ||  || — || February 6, 2000 || Višnjan Observatory || K. Korlević || KOR || align=right | 5.9 km || 
|-id=281 bgcolor=#d6d6d6
| 14281 ||  || — || February 6, 2000 || Socorro || LINEAR || KOR || align=right | 6.6 km || 
|-id=282 bgcolor=#d6d6d6
| 14282 Cruijff || 2097 P-L ||  || September 24, 1960 || Palomar || PLS || — || align=right | 5.4 km || 
|-id=283 bgcolor=#E9E9E9
| 14283 || 2206 P-L || — || September 24, 1960 || Palomar || PLS || — || align=right | 3.5 km || 
|-id=284 bgcolor=#fefefe
| 14284 || 2530 P-L || — || September 24, 1960 || Palomar || PLS || FLO || align=right | 3.9 km || 
|-id=285 bgcolor=#fefefe
| 14285 || 2566 P-L || — || September 24, 1960 || Palomar || PLS || NYS || align=right | 2.2 km || 
|-id=286 bgcolor=#fefefe
| 14286 || 2577 P-L || — || September 24, 1960 || Palomar || PLS || — || align=right | 2.8 km || 
|-id=287 bgcolor=#fefefe
| 14287 || 2777 P-L || — || September 24, 1960 || Palomar || PLS || NYS || align=right | 3.2 km || 
|-id=288 bgcolor=#E9E9E9
| 14288 || 2796 P-L || — || September 26, 1960 || Palomar || PLS || MIS || align=right | 3.3 km || 
|-id=289 bgcolor=#fefefe
| 14289 || 4648 P-L || — || September 24, 1960 || Palomar || PLS || MAS || align=right | 2.5 km || 
|-id=290 bgcolor=#E9E9E9
| 14290 || 9072 P-L || — || October 17, 1960 || Palomar || PLS || — || align=right | 5.6 km || 
|-id=291 bgcolor=#fefefe
| 14291 || 1104 T-1 || — || March 25, 1971 || Palomar || PLS || — || align=right | 6.6 km || 
|-id=292 bgcolor=#fefefe
| 14292 || 1148 T-1 || — || March 25, 1971 || Palomar || PLS || — || align=right | 1.8 km || 
|-id=293 bgcolor=#E9E9E9
| 14293 || 2307 T-1 || — || March 25, 1971 || Palomar || PLS || — || align=right | 2.8 km || 
|-id=294 bgcolor=#fefefe
| 14294 || 3306 T-1 || — || March 26, 1971 || Palomar || PLS || NYS || align=right | 2.2 km || 
|-id=295 bgcolor=#E9E9E9
| 14295 || 4161 T-1 || — || March 26, 1971 || Palomar || PLS || MAR || align=right | 5.3 km || 
|-id=296 bgcolor=#fefefe
| 14296 || 4298 T-1 || — || March 26, 1971 || Palomar || PLS || NYS || align=right | 5.2 km || 
|-id=297 bgcolor=#fefefe
| 14297 || 2124 T-2 || — || September 29, 1973 || Palomar || PLS || — || align=right | 2.3 km || 
|-id=298 bgcolor=#E9E9E9
| 14298 || 2144 T-2 || — || September 29, 1973 || Palomar || PLS || — || align=right | 3.6 km || 
|-id=299 bgcolor=#E9E9E9
| 14299 || 3162 T-2 || — || September 30, 1973 || Palomar || PLS || EUN || align=right | 5.1 km || 
|-id=300 bgcolor=#fefefe
| 14300 || 3336 T-2 || — || September 25, 1973 || Palomar || PLS || — || align=right | 3.2 km || 
|}

14301–14400 

|-bgcolor=#fefefe
| 14301 || 5205 T-2 || — || September 25, 1973 || Palomar || PLS || — || align=right | 3.4 km || 
|-id=302 bgcolor=#fefefe
| 14302 || 5482 T-2 || — || September 30, 1973 || Palomar || PLS || — || align=right | 4.3 km || 
|-id=303 bgcolor=#d6d6d6
| 14303 || 1144 T-3 || — || October 17, 1977 || Palomar || PLS || EOS || align=right | 5.4 km || 
|-id=304 bgcolor=#E9E9E9
| 14304 || 3417 T-3 || — || October 16, 1977 || Palomar || PLS || — || align=right | 5.3 km || 
|-id=305 bgcolor=#E9E9E9
| 14305 || 3437 T-3 || — || October 16, 1977 || Palomar || PLS || — || align=right | 3.8 km || 
|-id=306 bgcolor=#E9E9E9
| 14306 || 4327 T-3 || — || October 16, 1977 || Palomar || PLS || — || align=right | 8.1 km || 
|-id=307 bgcolor=#fefefe
| 14307 || 4336 T-3 || — || October 16, 1977 || Palomar || PLS || — || align=right | 2.1 km || 
|-id=308 bgcolor=#d6d6d6
| 14308 Hardeman || 5193 T-3 ||  || October 16, 1977 || Palomar || PLS || — || align=right | 9.6 km || 
|-id=309 bgcolor=#FA8072
| 14309 Defoy || A908 SA ||  || September 22, 1908 || Vienna || J. Palisa || — || align=right | 5.6 km || 
|-id=310 bgcolor=#E9E9E9
| 14310 Shuttleworth || 1966 PP ||  || August 7, 1966 || Bloemfontein || Boyden Obs. || — || align=right | 6.9 km || 
|-id=311 bgcolor=#fefefe
| 14311 ||  || — || October 26, 1971 || Hamburg-Bergedorf || L. Kohoutek || — || align=right | 2.9 km || 
|-id=312 bgcolor=#fefefe
| 14312 Polytech ||  ||  || October 26, 1976 || Nauchnij || T. M. Smirnova || — || align=right | 2.8 km || 
|-id=313 bgcolor=#d6d6d6
| 14313 Dodaira ||  ||  || October 22, 1976 || Kiso || H. Kosai, K. Furukawa || EOS || align=right | 8.0 km || 
|-id=314 bgcolor=#d6d6d6
| 14314 Tokigawa ||  ||  || February 18, 1977 || Kiso || H. Kosai, K. Furukawa || THM || align=right | 9.4 km || 
|-id=315 bgcolor=#d6d6d6
| 14315 Ogawamachi ||  ||  || March 12, 1977 || Kiso || H. Kosai, K. Furukawa || ALA || align=right | 15 km || 
|-id=316 bgcolor=#d6d6d6
| 14316 Higashichichibu ||  ||  || March 12, 1977 || Kiso || H. Kosai, K. Furukawa || — || align=right | 18 km || 
|-id=317 bgcolor=#fefefe
| 14317 Antonov ||  ||  || August 8, 1978 || Nauchnij || N. S. Chernykh || — || align=right | 3.9 km || 
|-id=318 bgcolor=#fefefe
| 14318 Buzinov ||  ||  || September 26, 1978 || Nauchnij || L. V. Zhuravleva || FLO || align=right | 3.0 km || 
|-id=319 bgcolor=#E9E9E9
| 14319 ||  || — || October 27, 1978 || Palomar || C. M. Olmstead || — || align=right | 4.2 km || 
|-id=320 bgcolor=#E9E9E9
| 14320 ||  || — || October 27, 1978 || Palomar || C. M. Olmstead || — || align=right | 8.3 km || 
|-id=321 bgcolor=#fefefe
| 14321 ||  || — || November 7, 1978 || Palomar || E. F. Helin, S. J. Bus || — || align=right | 2.2 km || 
|-id=322 bgcolor=#fefefe
| 14322 Shakura || 1978 YM ||  || December 22, 1978 || Nauchnij || N. S. Chernykh || — || align=right | 3.5 km || 
|-id=323 bgcolor=#fefefe
| 14323 ||  || — || June 25, 1979 || Siding Spring || E. F. Helin, S. J. Bus || — || align=right | 2.3 km || 
|-id=324 bgcolor=#E9E9E9
| 14324 ||  || — || June 25, 1979 || Siding Spring || E. F. Helin, S. J. Bus || HEN || align=right | 4.0 km || 
|-id=325 bgcolor=#d6d6d6
| 14325 ||  || — || June 25, 1979 || Siding Spring || E. F. Helin, S. J. Bus || HYG || align=right | 8.6 km || 
|-id=326 bgcolor=#fefefe
| 14326 || 1980 BA || — || January 21, 1980 || Harvard Observatory || Harvard Obs. || — || align=right | 3.9 km || 
|-id=327 bgcolor=#d6d6d6
| 14327 Lemke ||  ||  || March 16, 1980 || La Silla || C.-I. Lagerkvist || — || align=right | 9.2 km || 
|-id=328 bgcolor=#E9E9E9
| 14328 Granvik || 1980 VH ||  || November 8, 1980 || Anderson Mesa || E. Bowell || PAE || align=right | 8.3 km || 
|-id=329 bgcolor=#fefefe
| 14329 ||  || — || March 1, 1981 || Siding Spring || S. J. Bus || — || align=right | 3.3 km || 
|-id=330 bgcolor=#d6d6d6
| 14330 ||  || — || March 2, 1981 || Siding Spring || S. J. Bus || 7:4 || align=right | 10 km || 
|-id=331 bgcolor=#fefefe
| 14331 ||  || — || March 2, 1981 || Siding Spring || S. J. Bus || MAS || align=right | 1.6 km || 
|-id=332 bgcolor=#fefefe
| 14332 ||  || — || March 2, 1981 || Siding Spring || S. J. Bus || — || align=right | 3.6 km || 
|-id=333 bgcolor=#fefefe
| 14333 ||  || — || March 1, 1981 || Siding Spring || S. J. Bus || NYS || align=right | 2.1 km || 
|-id=334 bgcolor=#E9E9E9
| 14334 ||  || — || March 1, 1981 || Siding Spring || S. J. Bus || — || align=right | 6.5 km || 
|-id=335 bgcolor=#fefefe
| 14335 Alexosipov ||  ||  || September 3, 1981 || Nauchnij || N. S. Chernykh || FLO || align=right | 4.2 km || 
|-id=336 bgcolor=#fefefe
| 14336 ||  || — || October 24, 1981 || Palomar || S. J. Bus || — || align=right | 2.0 km || 
|-id=337 bgcolor=#E9E9E9
| 14337 ||  || — || November 16, 1981 || Bickley || Perth Obs. || — || align=right | 5.1 km || 
|-id=338 bgcolor=#d6d6d6
| 14338 Shibakoukan ||  ||  || November 14, 1982 || Kiso || H. Kosai, K. Furukawa || SAN || align=right | 8.7 km || 
|-id=339 bgcolor=#E9E9E9
| 14339 Knorre || 1983 GU ||  || April 10, 1983 || Nauchnij || L. I. Chernykh || — || align=right | 14 km || 
|-id=340 bgcolor=#fefefe
| 14340 ||  || — || September 2, 1983 || La Silla || H. Debehogne || ERI || align=right | 6.2 km || 
|-id=341 bgcolor=#E9E9E9
| 14341 ||  || — || September 4, 1983 || La Silla || H. Debehogne || — || align=right | 13 km || 
|-id=342 bgcolor=#E9E9E9
| 14342 Iglika || 1984 SL ||  || September 23, 1984 || Smolyan || V. G. Ivanova, V. G. Shkodrov || CLO || align=right | 14 km || 
|-id=343 bgcolor=#fefefe
| 14343 ||  || — || September 18, 1984 || La Silla || H. Debehogne || — || align=right | 4.2 km || 
|-id=344 bgcolor=#fefefe
| 14344 ||  || — || February 15, 1985 || La Silla || H. Debehogne || NYS || align=right | 4.3 km || 
|-id=345 bgcolor=#E9E9E9
| 14345 Gritsevich || 1985 PO ||  || August 14, 1985 || Anderson Mesa || E. Bowell || — || align=right | 4.8 km || 
|-id=346 bgcolor=#d6d6d6
| 14346 Zhilyaev ||  ||  || August 23, 1985 || Nauchnij || N. S. Chernykh || — || align=right | 13 km || 
|-id=347 bgcolor=#fefefe
| 14347 ||  || — || September 11, 1985 || La Silla || H. Debehogne || — || align=right | 2.6 km || 
|-id=348 bgcolor=#E9E9E9
| 14348 Cumming ||  ||  || October 20, 1985 || Kvistaberg || C.-I. Lagerkvist || HNS || align=right | 6.3 km || 
|-id=349 bgcolor=#d6d6d6
| 14349 Nikitamikhalkov ||  ||  || October 22, 1985 || Nauchnij || L. V. Zhuravleva || — || align=right | 12 km || 
|-id=350 bgcolor=#d6d6d6
| 14350 ||  || — || November 1, 1985 || La Silla || R. M. West || URS || align=right | 7.1 km || 
|-id=351 bgcolor=#fefefe
| 14351 Tomaskohout ||  ||  || September 6, 1986 || Anderson Mesa || E. Bowell || NYS || align=right | 3.6 km || 
|-id=352 bgcolor=#fefefe
| 14352 ||  || — || February 23, 1987 || La Silla || H. Debehogne || — || align=right | 3.3 km || 
|-id=353 bgcolor=#E9E9E9
| 14353 ||  || — || February 23, 1987 || La Silla || H. Debehogne || — || align=right | 6.8 km || 
|-id=354 bgcolor=#d6d6d6
| 14354 Kolesnikov ||  ||  || August 21, 1987 || La Silla || E. W. Elst || — || align=right | 9.6 km || 
|-id=355 bgcolor=#fefefe
| 14355 ||  || — || September 30, 1987 || Brorfelde || P. Jensen || ERI || align=right | 6.9 km || 
|-id=356 bgcolor=#fefefe
| 14356 ||  || — || September 21, 1987 || Kleť || Z. Vávrová || — || align=right | 6.9 km || 
|-id=357 bgcolor=#d6d6d6
| 14357 || 1987 UR || — || October 22, 1987 || Toyota || K. Suzuki, T. Urata || — || align=right | 9.6 km || 
|-id=358 bgcolor=#E9E9E9
| 14358 ||  || — || January 19, 1988 || La Silla || H. Debehogne || — || align=right | 3.5 km || 
|-id=359 bgcolor=#fefefe
| 14359 ||  || — || February 11, 1988 || La Silla || E. W. Elst || NYS || align=right | 2.8 km || 
|-id=360 bgcolor=#d6d6d6
| 14360 Ipatov ||  ||  || February 13, 1988 || La Silla || E. W. Elst || — || align=right | 17 km || 
|-id=361 bgcolor=#E9E9E9
| 14361 Boscovich || 1988 DE ||  || February 17, 1988 || Bologna || San Vittore Obs. || EUN || align=right | 7.6 km || 
|-id=362 bgcolor=#E9E9E9
| 14362 || 1988 MH || — || June 16, 1988 || Palomar || E. F. Helin || EUN || align=right | 8.5 km || 
|-id=363 bgcolor=#fefefe
| 14363 ||  || — || September 8, 1988 || Kleť || A. Mrkos || — || align=right | 3.1 km || 
|-id=364 bgcolor=#fefefe
| 14364 ||  || — || September 8, 1988 || Brorfelde || P. Jensen || FLO || align=right | 3.8 km || 
|-id=365 bgcolor=#E9E9E9
| 14365 Jeanpaul ||  ||  || September 8, 1988 || Tautenburg Observatory || F. Börngen || — || align=right | 3.2 km || 
|-id=366 bgcolor=#E9E9E9
| 14366 Wilhelmraabe ||  ||  || September 8, 1988 || Tautenburg Observatory || F. Börngen || HOF || align=right | 7.2 km || 
|-id=367 bgcolor=#d6d6d6
| 14367 Hippokrates ||  ||  || September 8, 1988 || Tautenburg Observatory || F. Börngen || THM || align=right | 6.3 km || 
|-id=368 bgcolor=#E9E9E9
| 14368 || 1988 TK || — || October 3, 1988 || Kushiro || S. Ueda, H. Kaneda || — || align=right | 6.4 km || 
|-id=369 bgcolor=#fefefe
| 14369 || 1988 UV || — || October 18, 1988 || Kushiro || S. Ueda, H. Kaneda || — || align=right | 3.5 km || 
|-id=370 bgcolor=#d6d6d6
| 14370 ||  || — || November 12, 1988 || Palomar || E. F. Helin || — || align=right | 4.9 km || 
|-id=371 bgcolor=#fefefe
| 14371 ||  || — || December 12, 1988 || Brorfelde || P. Jensen || — || align=right | 2.4 km || 
|-id=372 bgcolor=#d6d6d6
| 14372 Paulgerhardt ||  ||  || January 9, 1989 || Tautenburg Observatory || F. Börngen || EOS || align=right | 7.2 km || 
|-id=373 bgcolor=#fefefe
| 14373 || 1989 LT || — || June 3, 1989 || Palomar || E. F. Helin || NYS || align=right | 4.8 km || 
|-id=374 bgcolor=#E9E9E9
| 14374 || 1989 SA || — || September 21, 1989 || Siding Spring || R. H. McNaught || EUN || align=right | 5.7 km || 
|-id=375 bgcolor=#E9E9E9
| 14375 || 1989 SU || — || September 29, 1989 || Kushiro || S. Ueda, H. Kaneda || — || align=right | 5.3 km || 
|-id=376 bgcolor=#E9E9E9
| 14376 ||  || — || September 28, 1989 || La Silla || H. Debehogne || — || align=right | 6.4 km || 
|-id=377 bgcolor=#E9E9E9
| 14377 ||  || — || October 7, 1989 || La Silla || E. W. Elst || — || align=right | 5.6 km || 
|-id=378 bgcolor=#E9E9E9
| 14378 ||  || — || October 4, 1989 || La Silla || H. Debehogne || — || align=right | 3.8 km || 
|-id=379 bgcolor=#E9E9E9
| 14379 ||  || — || October 22, 1989 || Kleť || A. Mrkos || EUN || align=right | 7.1 km || 
|-id=380 bgcolor=#E9E9E9
| 14380 ||  || — || October 30, 1989 || Cerro Tololo || S. J. Bus || BRU || align=right | 18 km || 
|-id=381 bgcolor=#fefefe
| 14381 || 1990 CE || — || February 1, 1990 || Dynic || A. Sugie || FLO || align=right | 3.7 km || 
|-id=382 bgcolor=#d6d6d6
| 14382 Woszczyk ||  ||  || March 2, 1990 || La Silla || H. Debehogne || KOR || align=right | 5.8 km || 
|-id=383 bgcolor=#fefefe
| 14383 ||  || — || July 27, 1990 || Palomar || H. E. Holt || V || align=right | 3.2 km || 
|-id=384 bgcolor=#d6d6d6
| 14384 ||  || — || July 24, 1990 || Palomar || H. E. Holt || — || align=right | 8.5 km || 
|-id=385 bgcolor=#fefefe
| 14385 ||  || — || August 22, 1990 || Palomar || H. E. Holt || V || align=right | 3.1 km || 
|-id=386 bgcolor=#fefefe
| 14386 ||  || — || August 22, 1990 || Palomar || H. E. Holt || V || align=right | 2.9 km || 
|-id=387 bgcolor=#fefefe
| 14387 ||  || — || August 25, 1990 || Palomar || H. E. Holt || V || align=right | 2.9 km || 
|-id=388 bgcolor=#fefefe
| 14388 ||  || — || August 29, 1990 || Palomar || H. E. Holt || — || align=right | 4.8 km || 
|-id=389 bgcolor=#d6d6d6
| 14389 ||  || — || August 26, 1990 || Palomar || H. E. Holt || THM || align=right | 12 km || 
|-id=390 bgcolor=#d6d6d6
| 14390 ||  || — || August 26, 1990 || Palomar || H. E. Holt || — || align=right | 11 km || 
|-id=391 bgcolor=#fefefe
| 14391 ||  || — || September 14, 1990 || Palomar || H. E. Holt || — || align=right | 6.7 km || 
|-id=392 bgcolor=#fefefe
| 14392 ||  || — || September 11, 1990 || La Silla || H. Debehogne || V || align=right | 2.4 km || 
|-id=393 bgcolor=#E9E9E9
| 14393 ||  || — || September 22, 1990 || La Silla || E. W. Elst || — || align=right | 3.3 km || 
|-id=394 bgcolor=#d6d6d6
| 14394 ||  || — || September 18, 1990 || Palomar || H. E. Holt || — || align=right | 21 km || 
|-id=395 bgcolor=#fefefe
| 14395 Tommorgan ||  ||  || October 15, 1990 || Palomar || E. F. Helin || H || align=right | 1.9 km || 
|-id=396 bgcolor=#E9E9E9
| 14396 ||  || — || October 16, 1990 || La Silla || E. W. Elst || — || align=right | 7.6 km || 
|-id=397 bgcolor=#E9E9E9
| 14397 ||  || — || November 15, 1990 || La Silla || E. W. Elst || — || align=right | 4.1 km || 
|-id=398 bgcolor=#E9E9E9
| 14398 ||  || — || November 14, 1990 || La Silla || E. W. Elst || — || align=right | 5.4 km || 
|-id=399 bgcolor=#E9E9E9
| 14399 ||  || — || November 16, 1990 || La Silla || E. W. Elst || — || align=right | 3.9 km || 
|-id=400 bgcolor=#E9E9E9
| 14400 Baudot ||  ||  || November 16, 1990 || La Silla || E. W. Elst || — || align=right | 5.4 km || 
|}

14401–14500 

|-bgcolor=#E9E9E9
| 14401 Reikoyukawa || 1990 XV ||  || December 15, 1990 || Kitami || K. Endate, K. Watanabe || EUN || align=right | 6.6 km || 
|-id=402 bgcolor=#FFC2E0
| 14402 || 1991 DB || — || February 18, 1991 || Palomar || E. F. Helin || AMO || align=right data-sort-value="0.6" | 600 m || 
|-id=403 bgcolor=#E9E9E9
| 14403 de Machault ||  ||  || April 8, 1991 || La Silla || E. W. Elst || HOF || align=right | 7.5 km || 
|-id=404 bgcolor=#fefefe
| 14404 ||  || — || July 11, 1991 || La Silla || H. Debehogne || FLO || align=right | 3.3 km || 
|-id=405 bgcolor=#fefefe
| 14405 ||  || — || August 5, 1991 || Palomar || H. E. Holt || MAS || align=right | 2.6 km || 
|-id=406 bgcolor=#d6d6d6
| 14406 ||  || — || August 5, 1991 || Palomar || H. E. Holt || THM || align=right | 10 km || 
|-id=407 bgcolor=#d6d6d6
| 14407 ||  || — || August 5, 1991 || Palomar || H. E. Holt || — || align=right | 4.4 km || 
|-id=408 bgcolor=#d6d6d6
| 14408 ||  || — || August 6, 1991 || Palomar || H. E. Holt || — || align=right | 9.3 km || 
|-id=409 bgcolor=#d6d6d6
| 14409 ||  || — || September 5, 1991 || Siding Spring || R. H. McNaught || Tj (2.98) || align=right | 20 km || 
|-id=410 bgcolor=#d6d6d6
| 14410 ||  || — || September 7, 1991 || Kushiro || S. Ueda, H. Kaneda || — || align=right | 10 km || 
|-id=411 bgcolor=#fefefe
| 14411 Clérambault ||  ||  || September 6, 1991 || Haute Provence || E. W. Elst || FLO || align=right | 4.2 km || 
|-id=412 bgcolor=#fefefe
| 14412 Wolflojewski ||  ||  || September 9, 1991 || Tautenburg Observatory || L. D. Schmadel, F. Börngen || FLO || align=right | 4.0 km || 
|-id=413 bgcolor=#fefefe
| 14413 Geiger ||  ||  || September 5, 1991 || Tautenburg Observatory || F. Börngen, L. D. Schmadel || FLO || align=right | 3.8 km || 
|-id=414 bgcolor=#fefefe
| 14414 ||  || — || September 13, 1991 || Palomar || H. E. Holt || — || align=right | 2.8 km || 
|-id=415 bgcolor=#d6d6d6
| 14415 ||  || — || September 13, 1991 || Kushiro || S. Ueda, H. Kaneda || — || align=right | 7.8 km || 
|-id=416 bgcolor=#fefefe
| 14416 ||  || — || September 8, 1991 || Harvard Observatory || Oak Ridge Observatory || — || align=right | 2.2 km || 
|-id=417 bgcolor=#fefefe
| 14417 ||  || — || September 13, 1991 || Palomar || H. E. Holt || FLO || align=right | 2.4 km || 
|-id=418 bgcolor=#fefefe
| 14418 ||  || — || September 15, 1991 || Palomar || H. E. Holt || — || align=right | 2.3 km || 
|-id=419 bgcolor=#fefefe
| 14419 ||  || — || September 15, 1991 || Palomar || H. E. Holt || — || align=right | 3.3 km || 
|-id=420 bgcolor=#d6d6d6
| 14420 Massey || 1991 SM ||  || September 30, 1991 || Siding Spring || R. H. McNaught || EOS || align=right | 9.9 km || 
|-id=421 bgcolor=#d6d6d6
| 14421 ||  || — || September 30, 1991 || Siding Spring || R. H. McNaught || — || align=right | 5.5 km || 
|-id=422 bgcolor=#d6d6d6
| 14422 ||  || — || September 16, 1991 || Palomar || H. E. Holt || — || align=right | 7.1 km || 
|-id=423 bgcolor=#fefefe
| 14423 ||  || — || September 16, 1991 || Palomar || H. E. Holt || V || align=right | 3.1 km || 
|-id=424 bgcolor=#d6d6d6
| 14424 Laval ||  ||  || September 30, 1991 || Kitt Peak || Spacewatch || ALA || align=right | 13 km || 
|-id=425 bgcolor=#fefefe
| 14425 Fujimimachi ||  ||  || October 13, 1991 || Nyukasa || M. Hirasawa, S. Suzuki || — || align=right | 4.1 km || 
|-id=426 bgcolor=#fefefe
| 14426 Katotsuyoshi ||  ||  || October 29, 1991 || Kitami || K. Endate, K. Watanabe || — || align=right | 11 km || 
|-id=427 bgcolor=#fefefe
| 14427 ||  || — || November 9, 1991 || Kushiro || S. Ueda, H. Kaneda || — || align=right | 3.6 km || 
|-id=428 bgcolor=#d6d6d6
| 14428 Lazaridis ||  ||  || November 8, 1991 || Kitt Peak || Spacewatch || THM || align=right | 11 km || 
|-id=429 bgcolor=#fefefe
| 14429 Coyne || 1991 XC ||  || December 3, 1991 || Palomar || C. S. Shoemaker, D. H. Levy || PHO || align=right | 3.7 km || 
|-id=430 bgcolor=#E9E9E9
| 14430 || 1992 CH || — || February 10, 1992 || Uenohara || N. Kawasato || EUN || align=right | 6.5 km || 
|-id=431 bgcolor=#fefefe
| 14431 ||  || — || February 29, 1992 || La Silla || UESAC || — || align=right | 3.2 km || 
|-id=432 bgcolor=#fefefe
| 14432 ||  || — || March 2, 1992 || La Silla || UESAC || — || align=right | 4.3 km || 
|-id=433 bgcolor=#fefefe
| 14433 ||  || — || March 2, 1992 || La Silla || UESAC || V || align=right | 2.4 km || 
|-id=434 bgcolor=#fefefe
| 14434 ||  || — || March 6, 1992 || La Silla || UESAC || — || align=right | 9.7 km || 
|-id=435 bgcolor=#fefefe
| 14435 ||  || — || March 2, 1992 || La Silla || UESAC || V || align=right | 2.9 km || 
|-id=436 bgcolor=#E9E9E9
| 14436 Morishita ||  ||  || March 23, 1992 || Kitami || K. Endate, K. Watanabe || slow || align=right | 5.7 km || 
|-id=437 bgcolor=#E9E9E9
| 14437 ||  || — || April 4, 1992 || La Silla || E. W. Elst || — || align=right | 4.3 km || 
|-id=438 bgcolor=#d6d6d6
| 14438 MacLean ||  ||  || April 27, 1992 || Kitt Peak || Spacewatch || KOR || align=right | 4.4 km || 
|-id=439 bgcolor=#d6d6d6
| 14439 Evermeersch ||  ||  || September 2, 1992 || La Silla || E. W. Elst || KOR || align=right | 5.1 km || 
|-id=440 bgcolor=#d6d6d6
| 14440 ||  || — || September 2, 1992 || La Silla || E. W. Elst || — || align=right | 4.1 km || 
|-id=441 bgcolor=#E9E9E9
| 14441 Atakanoseki || 1992 SJ ||  || September 21, 1992 || Kitami || M. Yanai, K. Watanabe || CLO || align=right | 8.6 km || 
|-id=442 bgcolor=#d6d6d6
| 14442 ||  || — || September 30, 1992 || Palomar || H. E. Holt || EOS || align=right | 6.9 km || 
|-id=443 bgcolor=#d6d6d6
| 14443 Sekinenomatsu || 1992 TV ||  || October 1, 1992 || Kitami || M. Yanai, K. Watanabe || KOR || align=right | 5.9 km || 
|-id=444 bgcolor=#fefefe
| 14444 ||  || — || October 2, 1992 || Dynic || A. Sugie || FLO || align=right | 3.1 km || 
|-id=445 bgcolor=#d6d6d6
| 14445 Koichi ||  ||  || October 26, 1992 || Kitami || K. Endate, K. Watanabe || — || align=right | 9.7 km || 
|-id=446 bgcolor=#d6d6d6
| 14446 Kinkowan ||  ||  || October 31, 1992 || Kagoshima || M. Mukai, M. Takeishi || — || align=right | 12 km || 
|-id=447 bgcolor=#d6d6d6
| 14447 Hosakakanai || 1992 VL ||  || November 2, 1992 || Kitami || K. Endate, K. Watanabe || — || align=right | 7.9 km || 
|-id=448 bgcolor=#d6d6d6
| 14448 || 1992 VQ || — || November 2, 1992 || Kushiro || S. Ueda, H. Kaneda || THM || align=right | 11 km || 
|-id=449 bgcolor=#fefefe
| 14449 Myogizinzya ||  ||  || November 16, 1992 || Kitami || K. Endate, K. Watanabe || — || align=right | 3.1 km || 
|-id=450 bgcolor=#d6d6d6
| 14450 ||  || — || November 18, 1992 || Kushiro || S. Ueda, H. Kaneda || EOS || align=right | 8.9 km || 
|-id=451 bgcolor=#d6d6d6
| 14451 ||  || — || November 27, 1992 || Kushiro || S. Ueda, H. Kaneda || slow || align=right | 11 km || 
|-id=452 bgcolor=#d6d6d6
| 14452 ||  || — || November 25, 1992 || Palomar || H. E. Holt || slow || align=right | 4.8 km || 
|-id=453 bgcolor=#fefefe
| 14453 ||  || — || March 17, 1993 || La Silla || UESAC || — || align=right | 3.5 km || 
|-id=454 bgcolor=#fefefe
| 14454 ||  || — || March 17, 1993 || La Silla || UESAC || FLO || align=right | 2.8 km || 
|-id=455 bgcolor=#fefefe
| 14455 ||  || — || March 17, 1993 || La Silla || UESAC || FLO || align=right | 3.6 km || 
|-id=456 bgcolor=#d6d6d6
| 14456 ||  || — || March 19, 1993 || La Silla || UESAC || — || align=right | 11 km || 
|-id=457 bgcolor=#fefefe
| 14457 ||  || — || March 21, 1993 || La Silla || UESAC || FLO || align=right | 3.5 km || 
|-id=458 bgcolor=#fefefe
| 14458 ||  || — || March 21, 1993 || La Silla || UESAC || — || align=right | 2.0 km || 
|-id=459 bgcolor=#fefefe
| 14459 ||  || — || March 21, 1993 || La Silla || UESAC || — || align=right | 2.8 km || 
|-id=460 bgcolor=#fefefe
| 14460 ||  || — || March 19, 1993 || La Silla || UESAC || — || align=right | 3.4 km || 
|-id=461 bgcolor=#FA8072
| 14461 ||  || — || March 17, 1993 || La Silla || UESAC || — || align=right | 3.9 km || 
|-id=462 bgcolor=#fefefe
| 14462 || 1993 GA || — || April 2, 1993 || Kitt Peak || M. Stockmaster, T. J. Balonek || V || align=right | 1.6 km || 
|-id=463 bgcolor=#fefefe
| 14463 McCarter ||  ||  || April 15, 1993 || Kitt Peak || Spacewatch || V || align=right | 2.3 km || 
|-id=464 bgcolor=#fefefe
| 14464 ||  || — || April 21, 1993 || Siding Spring || R. H. McNaught || — || align=right | 2.5 km || 
|-id=465 bgcolor=#fefefe
| 14465 || 1993 NB || — || July 15, 1993 || Kiyosato || S. Otomo || — || align=right | 11 km || 
|-id=466 bgcolor=#E9E9E9
| 14466 Hodge ||  ||  || July 25, 1993 || Manastash Ridge || M. Hammergren || — || align=right | 4.4 km || 
|-id=467 bgcolor=#E9E9E9
| 14467 Vranckx ||  ||  || July 20, 1993 || La Silla || E. W. Elst || — || align=right | 3.4 km || 
|-id=468 bgcolor=#fefefe
| 14468 Ottostern ||  ||  || July 19, 1993 || La Silla || E. W. Elst || NYS || align=right | 2.9 km || 
|-id=469 bgcolor=#E9E9E9
| 14469 Komatsuataka || 1993 RK ||  || September 12, 1993 || Kitami || K. Endate, K. Watanabe || — || align=right | 4.0 km || 
|-id=470 bgcolor=#E9E9E9
| 14470 ||  || — || September 15, 1993 || La Silla || E. W. Elst || — || align=right | 4.1 km || 
|-id=471 bgcolor=#E9E9E9
| 14471 ||  || — || September 21, 1993 || Siding Spring || R. H. McNaught || — || align=right | 5.5 km || 
|-id=472 bgcolor=#fefefe
| 14472 ||  || — || September 22, 1993 || Palomar || T. B. Spahr || H || align=right | 2.7 km || 
|-id=473 bgcolor=#E9E9E9
| 14473 ||  || — || October 9, 1993 || La Silla || E. W. Elst || — || align=right | 5.3 km || 
|-id=474 bgcolor=#E9E9E9
| 14474 ||  || — || October 9, 1993 || La Silla || E. W. Elst || — || align=right | 3.0 km || 
|-id=475 bgcolor=#E9E9E9
| 14475 || 1993 VT || — || November 14, 1993 || Oizumi || T. Kobayashi || ADE || align=right | 8.2 km || 
|-id=476 bgcolor=#E9E9E9
| 14476 ||  || — || December 14, 1993 || Palomar || PCAS || EUN || align=right | 6.3 km || 
|-id=477 bgcolor=#d6d6d6
| 14477 || 1994 CN || — || February 2, 1994 || Fujieda || H. Shiozawa, T. Urata || — || align=right | 6.9 km || 
|-id=478 bgcolor=#d6d6d6
| 14478 ||  || — || February 12, 1994 || Oizumi || T. Kobayashi || THM || align=right | 11 km || 
|-id=479 bgcolor=#d6d6d6
| 14479 Plekhanov ||  ||  || February 8, 1994 || La Silla || E. W. Elst || HYG || align=right | 11 km || 
|-id=480 bgcolor=#fefefe
| 14480 ||  || — || August 11, 1994 || Kiyosato || S. Otomo || FLO || align=right | 3.5 km || 
|-id=481 bgcolor=#fefefe
| 14481 ||  || — || August 10, 1994 || La Silla || E. W. Elst || — || align=right | 6.5 km || 
|-id=482 bgcolor=#fefefe
| 14482 ||  || — || August 10, 1994 || La Silla || E. W. Elst || — || align=right | 7.2 km || 
|-id=483 bgcolor=#fefefe
| 14483 ||  || — || August 12, 1994 || La Silla || E. W. Elst || — || align=right | 3.6 km || 
|-id=484 bgcolor=#fefefe
| 14484 ||  || — || August 12, 1994 || La Silla || E. W. Elst || — || align=right | 2.6 km || 
|-id=485 bgcolor=#fefefe
| 14485 ||  || — || September 11, 1994 || Kiyosato || S. Otomo || NYS || align=right | 3.9 km || 
|-id=486 bgcolor=#fefefe
| 14486 Tuscia || 1994 TE ||  || October 4, 1994 || San Marcello || L. Tesi, G. Cattani || — || align=right | 2.0 km || 
|-id=487 bgcolor=#fefefe
| 14487 Sakaisakae ||  ||  || October 2, 1994 || Kitami || K. Endate, K. Watanabe || — || align=right | 2.2 km || 
|-id=488 bgcolor=#fefefe
| 14488 ||  || — || October 13, 1994 || Kiyosato || S. Otomo || — || align=right | 4.4 km || 
|-id=489 bgcolor=#fefefe
| 14489 || 1994 UW || — || October 31, 1994 || Nachi-Katsuura || Y. Shimizu, T. Urata || V || align=right | 2.1 km || 
|-id=490 bgcolor=#fefefe
| 14490 ||  || — || October 31, 1994 || Kushiro || S. Ueda, H. Kaneda || NYS || align=right | 3.8 km || 
|-id=491 bgcolor=#E9E9E9
| 14491 Hitachiomiya ||  ||  || November 4, 1994 || Kitami || K. Endate, K. Watanabe || — || align=right | 5.5 km || 
|-id=492 bgcolor=#E9E9E9
| 14492 Bistar ||  ||  || November 4, 1994 || Kitami || K. Endate, K. Watanabe || — || align=right | 11 km || 
|-id=493 bgcolor=#fefefe
| 14493 ||  || — || November 26, 1994 || Nachi-Katsuura || Y. Shimizu, T. Urata || — || align=right | 3.8 km || 
|-id=494 bgcolor=#E9E9E9
| 14494 ||  || — || December 30, 1994 || Kushiro || S. Ueda, H. Kaneda || EUN || align=right | 7.0 km || 
|-id=495 bgcolor=#E9E9E9
| 14495 ||  || — || January 6, 1995 || Nyukasa || M. Hirasawa, S. Suzuki || — || align=right | 10 km || 
|-id=496 bgcolor=#d6d6d6
| 14496 ||  || — || January 28, 1995 || Kushiro || S. Ueda, H. Kaneda || — || align=right | 8.5 km || 
|-id=497 bgcolor=#E9E9E9
| 14497 || 1995 DD || — || February 20, 1995 || Oizumi || T. Kobayashi || EUN || align=right | 6.9 km || 
|-id=498 bgcolor=#E9E9E9
| 14498 Bernini ||  ||  || February 28, 1995 || Colleverde || V. S. Casulli || XIZ || align=right | 6.8 km || 
|-id=499 bgcolor=#fefefe
| 14499 Satotoshio ||  ||  || November 15, 1995 || Kitami || K. Endate, K. Watanabe || — || align=right | 2.5 km || 
|-id=500 bgcolor=#fefefe
| 14500 Kibo ||  ||  || November 27, 1995 || Oizumi || T. Kobayashi || — || align=right | 2.2 km || 
|}

14501–14600 

|-bgcolor=#fefefe
| 14501 Tetsuokojima ||  ||  || November 29, 1995 || Oizumi || T. Kobayashi || FLO || align=right | 2.5 km || 
|-id=502 bgcolor=#fefefe
| 14502 Morden ||  ||  || November 17, 1995 || Kitt Peak || Spacewatch || FLO || align=right | 1.7 km || 
|-id=503 bgcolor=#fefefe
| 14503 ||  || — || November 25, 1995 || Kushiro || S. Ueda, H. Kaneda || — || align=right | 2.5 km || 
|-id=504 bgcolor=#fefefe
| 14504 Tsujimura ||  ||  || December 27, 1995 || Oizumi || T. Kobayashi || FLO || align=right | 3.0 km || 
|-id=505 bgcolor=#fefefe
| 14505 Barentine ||  ||  || January 12, 1996 || Kitt Peak || Spacewatch || NYS || align=right | 3.9 km || 
|-id=506 bgcolor=#fefefe
| 14506 ||  || — || January 26, 1996 || Oizumi || T. Kobayashi || FLO || align=right | 2.9 km || 
|-id=507 bgcolor=#fefefe
| 14507 ||  || — || February 14, 1996 || Višnjan Observatory || Višnjan Obs. || V || align=right | 2.2 km || 
|-id=508 bgcolor=#E9E9E9
| 14508 ||  || — || February 23, 1996 || Oizumi || T. Kobayashi || — || align=right | 4.1 km || 
|-id=509 bgcolor=#fefefe
| 14509 Lučenec ||  ||  || March 9, 1996 || Modra || A. Galád, A. Pravda || — || align=right | 2.8 km || 
|-id=510 bgcolor=#fefefe
| 14510 ||  || — || March 15, 1996 || Haleakala || NEAT || FLO || align=right | 6.0 km || 
|-id=511 bgcolor=#fefefe
| 14511 Nickel ||  ||  || March 11, 1996 || Kitt Peak || Spacewatch || — || align=right | 4.1 km || 
|-id=512 bgcolor=#fefefe
| 14512 ||  || — || April 6, 1996 || Xinglong || SCAP || FLO || align=right | 3.5 km || 
|-id=513 bgcolor=#E9E9E9
| 14513 Alicelindner ||  ||  || April 15, 1996 || La Silla || E. W. Elst || — || align=right | 5.1 km || 
|-id=514 bgcolor=#E9E9E9
| 14514 ||  || — || April 15, 1996 || La Silla || E. W. Elst || RAF || align=right | 4.2 km || 
|-id=515 bgcolor=#E9E9E9
| 14515 Koichisato ||  ||  || April 21, 1996 || Nanyo || T. Okuni || — || align=right | 6.8 km || 
|-id=516 bgcolor=#E9E9E9
| 14516 ||  || — || April 17, 1996 || La Silla || E. W. Elst || — || align=right | 3.4 km || 
|-id=517 bgcolor=#E9E9E9
| 14517 Monitoma ||  ||  || June 13, 1996 || Ondřejov || P. Pravec || — || align=right | 8.2 km || 
|-id=518 bgcolor=#C2FFFF
| 14518 ||  || — || September 13, 1996 || La Silla || UDTS || L4 || align=right | 17 km || 
|-id=519 bgcolor=#d6d6d6
| 14519 Ural ||  ||  || October 8, 1996 || La Silla || E. W. Elst || THM || align=right | 10 km || 
|-id=520 bgcolor=#E9E9E9
| 14520 ||  || — || April 3, 1997 || Socorro || LINEAR || — || align=right | 2.8 km || 
|-id=521 bgcolor=#E9E9E9
| 14521 ||  || — || April 3, 1997 || Socorro || LINEAR || — || align=right | 4.5 km || 
|-id=522 bgcolor=#fefefe
| 14522 ||  || — || April 6, 1997 || Socorro || LINEAR || — || align=right | 3.7 km || 
|-id=523 bgcolor=#fefefe
| 14523 ||  || — || April 6, 1997 || Socorro || LINEAR || V || align=right | 3.2 km || 
|-id=524 bgcolor=#d6d6d6
| 14524 ||  || — || April 6, 1997 || Socorro || LINEAR || KOR || align=right | 3.7 km || 
|-id=525 bgcolor=#fefefe
| 14525 ||  || — || April 6, 1997 || Socorro || LINEAR || V || align=right | 1.8 km || 
|-id=526 bgcolor=#fefefe
| 14526 Xenocrates ||  ||  || May 6, 1997 || Prescott || P. G. Comba || NYS || align=right | 2.1 km || 
|-id=527 bgcolor=#fefefe
| 14527 ||  || — || May 3, 1997 || La Silla || E. W. Elst || V || align=right | 1.9 km || 
|-id=528 bgcolor=#fefefe
| 14528 ||  || — || May 3, 1997 || La Silla || E. W. Elst || — || align=right | 2.5 km || 
|-id=529 bgcolor=#E9E9E9
| 14529 ||  || — || July 6, 1997 || Rand || G. R. Viscome || — || align=right | 3.1 km || 
|-id=530 bgcolor=#fefefe
| 14530 || 1997 PR || — || August 1, 1997 || Woomera || F. B. Zoltowski || KLI || align=right | 6.5 km || 
|-id=531 bgcolor=#d6d6d6
| 14531 ||  || — || August 7, 1997 || Rand || G. R. Viscome || — || align=right | 8.1 km || 
|-id=532 bgcolor=#E9E9E9
| 14532 || 1997 QM || — || August 25, 1997 || Kleť || Z. Moravec || — || align=right | 4.3 km || 
|-id=533 bgcolor=#E9E9E9
| 14533 Roy || 1997 QY ||  || August 24, 1997 || Bédoin || P. Antonini || — || align=right | 3.7 km || 
|-id=534 bgcolor=#E9E9E9
| 14534 ||  || — || August 27, 1997 || Nachi-Katsuura || Y. Shimizu, T. Urata || — || align=right | 9.3 km || 
|-id=535 bgcolor=#d6d6d6
| 14535 Kazuyukihanda || 1997 RF ||  || September 1, 1997 || Yatsuka || H. Abe || — || align=right | 18 km || 
|-id=536 bgcolor=#E9E9E9
| 14536 ||  || — || September 3, 1997 || Woomera || F. B. Zoltowski || AGN || align=right | 3.7 km || 
|-id=537 bgcolor=#E9E9E9
| 14537 Týn nad Vltavou ||  ||  || September 10, 1997 || Kleť || M. Tichý, Z. Moravec || EUN || align=right | 3.5 km || 
|-id=538 bgcolor=#d6d6d6
| 14538 ||  || — || September 12, 1997 || Xinglong || SCAP || EOS || align=right | 6.1 km || 
|-id=539 bgcolor=#E9E9E9
| 14539 Clocke Roeland ||  ||  || September 10, 1997 || Uccle || T. Pauwels || — || align=right | 3.1 km || 
|-id=540 bgcolor=#d6d6d6
| 14540 ||  || — || September 13, 1997 || Xinglong || SCAP || — || align=right | 6.3 km || 
|-id=541 bgcolor=#d6d6d6
| 14541 Sacrobosco || 1997 SF ||  || September 20, 1997 || Kleť || J. Tichá, M. Tichý || HYG || align=right | 7.4 km || 
|-id=542 bgcolor=#d6d6d6
| 14542 Karitskaya ||  ||  || September 29, 1997 || Goodricke-Pigott || R. A. Tucker || — || align=right | 6.0 km || 
|-id=543 bgcolor=#d6d6d6
| 14543 Sajigawasuiseki ||  ||  || September 28, 1997 || Saji || Saji Obs. || — || align=right | 7.0 km || 
|-id=544 bgcolor=#d6d6d6
| 14544 Ericjones ||  ||  || September 29, 1997 || Kitt Peak || Spacewatch || EOS || align=right | 9.8 km || 
|-id=545 bgcolor=#d6d6d6
| 14545 ||  || — || September 29, 1997 || Nachi-Katsuura || Y. Shimizu, T. Urata || EOS || align=right | 5.6 km || 
|-id=546 bgcolor=#E9E9E9
| 14546 ||  || — || October 3, 1997 || Xinglong || SCAP || — || align=right | 4.7 km || 
|-id=547 bgcolor=#d6d6d6
| 14547 ||  || — || October 8, 1997 || Gekko || T. Kagawa, T. Urata || THM || align=right | 7.4 km || 
|-id=548 bgcolor=#d6d6d6
| 14548 ||  || — || October 5, 1997 || Xinglong || SCAP || EOS || align=right | 8.0 km || 
|-id=549 bgcolor=#E9E9E9
| 14549 ||  || — || October 8, 1997 || Kiyosato || S. Otomo || — || align=right | 5.2 km || 
|-id=550 bgcolor=#fefefe
| 14550 Lehký ||  ||  || October 27, 1997 || Ondřejov || L. Kotková || V || align=right | 3.4 km || 
|-id=551 bgcolor=#E9E9E9
| 14551 Itagaki ||  ||  || October 22, 1997 || Nanyo || T. Okuni || — || align=right | 10 km || 
|-id=552 bgcolor=#d6d6d6
| 14552 ||  || — || October 24, 1997 || Xinglong || SCAP || — || align=right | 8.8 km || 
|-id=553 bgcolor=#d6d6d6
| 14553 ||  || — || October 27, 1997 || Kiyosato || S. Otomo || KOR || align=right | 7.3 km || 
|-id=554 bgcolor=#d6d6d6
| 14554 ||  || — || October 27, 1997 || Kiyosato || S. Otomo || — || align=right | 11 km || 
|-id=555 bgcolor=#d6d6d6
| 14555 Shinohara || 1997 VQ ||  || November 1, 1997 || Kitami || K. Endate, K. Watanabe || EOS || align=right | 9.2 km || 
|-id=556 bgcolor=#d6d6d6
| 14556 ||  || — || November 1, 1997 || Kushiro || S. Ueda, H. Kaneda || THM || align=right | 10 km || 
|-id=557 bgcolor=#d6d6d6
| 14557 ||  || — || November 15, 1997 || Woomera || F. B. Zoltowski || — || align=right | 9.7 km || 
|-id=558 bgcolor=#d6d6d6
| 14558 Wangganchang ||  ||  || November 19, 1997 || Xinglong || SCAP || EOS || align=right | 8.4 km || 
|-id=559 bgcolor=#d6d6d6
| 14559 ||  || — || November 29, 1997 || Ondřejov || P. Pravec || EOS || align=right | 7.3 km || 
|-id=560 bgcolor=#d6d6d6
| 14560 ||  || — || November 29, 1997 || Socorro || LINEAR || 7:4 || align=right | 11 km || 
|-id=561 bgcolor=#d6d6d6
| 14561 ||  || — || November 29, 1997 || Socorro || LINEAR || — || align=right | 9.3 km || 
|-id=562 bgcolor=#d6d6d6
| 14562 ||  || — || December 27, 1997 || Xinglong || SCAP || — || align=right | 9.3 km || 
|-id=563 bgcolor=#fefefe
| 14563 ||  || — || January 8, 1998 || Caussols || ODAS || — || align=right | 3.3 km || 
|-id=564 bgcolor=#d6d6d6
| 14564 Heasley ||  ||  || January 26, 1998 || Kitt Peak || Spacewatch || — || align=right | 12 km || 
|-id=565 bgcolor=#fefefe
| 14565 ||  || — || March 1, 1998 || La Silla || E. W. Elst || — || align=right | 3.7 km || 
|-id=566 bgcolor=#E9E9E9
| 14566 Hokuleʻa ||  ||  || June 19, 1998 || Anderson Mesa || LONEOS || — || align=right | 11 km || 
|-id=567 bgcolor=#fefefe
| 14567 Nicovincenti ||  ||  || June 19, 1998 || Socorro || LINEAR || V || align=right | 3.4 km || 
|-id=568 bgcolor=#fefefe
| 14568 Zanotta || 1998 OK ||  || July 19, 1998 || San Marcello || A. Boattini, M. Tombelli || V || align=right | 3.0 km || 
|-id=569 bgcolor=#d6d6d6
| 14569 ||  || — || August 17, 1998 || Socorro || LINEAR || 3:2 || align=right | 18 km || 
|-id=570 bgcolor=#fefefe
| 14570 Burkam ||  ||  || August 17, 1998 || Socorro || LINEAR || — || align=right | 2.1 km || 
|-id=571 bgcolor=#E9E9E9
| 14571 Caralexander ||  ||  || August 17, 1998 || Socorro || LINEAR || — || align=right | 4.2 km || 
|-id=572 bgcolor=#fefefe
| 14572 Armando ||  ||  || August 27, 1998 || Anderson Mesa || LONEOS || — || align=right | 3.3 km || 
|-id=573 bgcolor=#fefefe
| 14573 Montebugnoli ||  ||  || August 27, 1998 || Anderson Mesa || LONEOS || FLO || align=right | 2.3 km || 
|-id=574 bgcolor=#fefefe
| 14574 Payette ||  ||  || August 30, 1998 || Kitt Peak || Spacewatch || FLO || align=right | 2.0 km || 
|-id=575 bgcolor=#fefefe
| 14575 Jamesblanc ||  ||  || August 28, 1998 || Socorro || LINEAR || — || align=right | 3.2 km || 
|-id=576 bgcolor=#fefefe
| 14576 Jefholley ||  ||  || August 28, 1998 || Socorro || LINEAR || — || align=right | 3.3 km || 
|-id=577 bgcolor=#E9E9E9
| 14577 ||  || — || August 28, 1998 || Socorro || LINEAR || — || align=right | 5.8 km || 
|-id=578 bgcolor=#E9E9E9
| 14578 ||  || — || August 28, 1998 || Socorro || LINEAR || EUN || align=right | 5.0 km || 
|-id=579 bgcolor=#fefefe
| 14579 ||  || — || August 26, 1998 || La Silla || E. W. Elst || — || align=right | 2.9 km || 
|-id=580 bgcolor=#E9E9E9
| 14580 ||  || — || August 26, 1998 || La Silla || E. W. Elst || — || align=right | 3.7 km || 
|-id=581 bgcolor=#FA8072
| 14581 ||  || — || September 14, 1998 || Socorro || LINEAR || — || align=right | 8.2 km || 
|-id=582 bgcolor=#fefefe
| 14582 Conlin ||  ||  || September 14, 1998 || Socorro || LINEAR || — || align=right | 4.0 km || 
|-id=583 bgcolor=#E9E9E9
| 14583 Lester ||  ||  || September 14, 1998 || Socorro || LINEAR || — || align=right | 3.2 km || 
|-id=584 bgcolor=#fefefe
| 14584 Lawson ||  ||  || September 14, 1998 || Socorro || LINEAR || — || align=right | 3.1 km || 
|-id=585 bgcolor=#fefefe
| 14585 ||  || — || September 14, 1998 || Socorro || LINEAR || NYS || align=right | 4.1 km || 
|-id=586 bgcolor=#E9E9E9
| 14586 ||  || — || September 14, 1998 || Socorro || LINEAR || — || align=right | 5.2 km || 
|-id=587 bgcolor=#fefefe
| 14587 ||  || — || September 14, 1998 || Socorro || LINEAR || FLO || align=right | 2.5 km || 
|-id=588 bgcolor=#fefefe
| 14588 Pharrams ||  ||  || September 14, 1998 || Socorro || LINEAR || V || align=right | 2.9 km || 
|-id=589 bgcolor=#fefefe
| 14589 Stevenbyrnes ||  ||  || September 14, 1998 || Socorro || LINEAR || — || align=right | 3.0 km || 
|-id=590 bgcolor=#fefefe
| 14590 ||  || — || September 14, 1998 || Socorro || LINEAR || — || align=right | 3.1 km || 
|-id=591 bgcolor=#fefefe
| 14591 ||  || — || September 23, 1998 || Višnjan Observatory || Višnjan Obs. || — || align=right | 2.7 km || 
|-id=592 bgcolor=#fefefe
| 14592 ||  || — || September 20, 1998 || Woomera || F. B. Zoltowski || V || align=right | 2.5 km || 
|-id=593 bgcolor=#fefefe
| 14593 Everett ||  ||  || September 22, 1998 || Anderson Mesa || LONEOS || — || align=right | 1.6 km || 
|-id=594 bgcolor=#E9E9E9
| 14594 Jindrašilhán ||  ||  || September 24, 1998 || Ondřejov || P. Pravec || EUN || align=right | 3.8 km || 
|-id=595 bgcolor=#E9E9E9
| 14595 Peaker ||  ||  || September 23, 1998 || Kitt Peak || Spacewatch || — || align=right | 3.3 km || 
|-id=596 bgcolor=#fefefe
| 14596 Bergstralh ||  ||  || September 16, 1998 || Anderson Mesa || LONEOS || — || align=right | 3.4 km || 
|-id=597 bgcolor=#fefefe
| 14597 Waynerichie ||  ||  || September 17, 1998 || Anderson Mesa || LONEOS || — || align=right | 2.4 km || 
|-id=598 bgcolor=#fefefe
| 14598 Larrysmith ||  ||  || September 17, 1998 || Anderson Mesa || LONEOS || — || align=right | 1.9 km || 
|-id=599 bgcolor=#fefefe
| 14599 ||  || — || September 20, 1998 || La Silla || E. W. Elst || — || align=right | 2.8 km || 
|-id=600 bgcolor=#E9E9E9
| 14600 Gainsbourg ||  ||  || September 21, 1998 || La Silla || E. W. Elst || — || align=right | 3.3 km || 
|}

14601–14700 

|-bgcolor=#fefefe
| 14601 ||  || — || September 21, 1998 || La Silla || E. W. Elst || — || align=right | 6.4 km || 
|-id=602 bgcolor=#fefefe
| 14602 ||  || — || September 21, 1998 || La Silla || E. W. Elst || — || align=right | 2.4 km || 
|-id=603 bgcolor=#E9E9E9
| 14603 ||  || — || September 26, 1998 || Socorro || LINEAR || EUN || align=right | 4.7 km || 
|-id=604 bgcolor=#d6d6d6
| 14604 ||  || — || September 26, 1998 || Socorro || LINEAR || — || align=right | 8.2 km || 
|-id=605 bgcolor=#fefefe
| 14605 Hyeyeonchoi ||  ||  || September 26, 1998 || Socorro || LINEAR || FLO || align=right | 3.9 km || 
|-id=606 bgcolor=#fefefe
| 14606 Hifleischer ||  ||  || September 26, 1998 || Socorro || LINEAR || V || align=right | 2.3 km || 
|-id=607 bgcolor=#fefefe
| 14607 ||  || — || September 26, 1998 || Socorro || LINEAR || FLO || align=right | 3.3 km || 
|-id=608 bgcolor=#fefefe
| 14608 ||  || — || September 26, 1998 || Socorro || LINEAR || — || align=right | 4.0 km || 
|-id=609 bgcolor=#fefefe
| 14609 ||  || — || September 20, 1998 || La Silla || E. W. Elst || — || align=right | 3.3 km || 
|-id=610 bgcolor=#E9E9E9
| 14610 ||  || — || September 20, 1998 || La Silla || E. W. Elst || DOR || align=right | 9.1 km || 
|-id=611 bgcolor=#E9E9E9
| 14611 Elsaadawi ||  ||  || September 20, 1998 || La Silla || E. W. Elst || — || align=right | 2.8 km || 
|-id=612 bgcolor=#d6d6d6
| 14612 Irtish ||  ||  || September 18, 1998 || La Silla || E. W. Elst || — || align=right | 16 km || 
|-id=613 bgcolor=#E9E9E9
| 14613 Sanchez ||  ||  || October 13, 1998 || Caussols || ODAS || — || align=right | 5.6 km || 
|-id=614 bgcolor=#d6d6d6
| 14614 ||  || — || October 13, 1998 || Caussols || ODAS || — || align=right | 7.6 km || 
|-id=615 bgcolor=#fefefe
| 14615 ||  || — || October 13, 1998 || Višnjan Observatory || K. Korlević || — || align=right | 3.8 km || 
|-id=616 bgcolor=#fefefe
| 14616 Van Gaal ||  ||  || October 10, 1998 || Anderson Mesa || LONEOS || — || align=right | 4.3 km || 
|-id=617 bgcolor=#d6d6d6
| 14617 Lasvergnas ||  ||  || October 21, 1998 || Caussols || ODAS || — || align=right | 6.7 km || 
|-id=618 bgcolor=#E9E9E9
| 14618 ||  || — || October 22, 1998 || Višnjan Observatory || K. Korlević || MAR || align=right | 6.2 km || 
|-id=619 bgcolor=#fefefe
| 14619 Plotkin ||  ||  || October 16, 1998 || Kitt Peak || Spacewatch || FLO || align=right | 1.8 km || 
|-id=620 bgcolor=#fefefe
| 14620 ||  || — || October 23, 1998 || Višnjan Observatory || K. Korlević || — || align=right | 5.5 km || 
|-id=621 bgcolor=#fefefe
| 14621 Tati ||  ||  || October 22, 1998 || Reedy Creek || J. Broughton || — || align=right | 2.9 km || 
|-id=622 bgcolor=#d6d6d6
| 14622 Arcadiopoveda ||  ||  || October 28, 1998 || Catalina || CSS || EUP || align=right | 13 km || 
|-id=623 bgcolor=#fefefe
| 14623 Kamoun ||  ||  || October 17, 1998 || Anderson Mesa || LONEOS || — || align=right | 5.5 km || 
|-id=624 bgcolor=#E9E9E9
| 14624 Prymachenko ||  ||  || October 18, 1998 || Anderson Mesa || LONEOS || — || align=right | 6.8 km || 
|-id=625 bgcolor=#E9E9E9
| 14625 ||  || — || October 18, 1998 || Xinglong || SCAP || EUN || align=right | 10 km || 
|-id=626 bgcolor=#E9E9E9
| 14626 ||  || — || October 28, 1998 || Socorro || LINEAR || MIT || align=right | 7.7 km || 
|-id=627 bgcolor=#E9E9E9
| 14627 Emilkowalski || 1998 VA ||  || November 7, 1998 || Quail Hollow Observatory || R. A. Kowalski || EMI || align=right | 7.1 km || 
|-id=628 bgcolor=#fefefe
| 14628 ||  || — || November 10, 1998 || Socorro || LINEAR || — || align=right | 3.4 km || 
|-id=629 bgcolor=#fefefe
| 14629 ||  || — || November 10, 1998 || Socorro || LINEAR || FLO || align=right | 3.1 km || 
|-id=630 bgcolor=#E9E9E9
| 14630 ||  || — || November 10, 1998 || Socorro || LINEAR || EUN || align=right | 6.6 km || 
|-id=631 bgcolor=#d6d6d6
| 14631 Benbryan ||  ||  || November 15, 1998 || Catalina || CSS || — || align=right | 17 km || 
|-id=632 bgcolor=#E9E9E9
| 14632 Flensburg ||  ||  || November 11, 1998 || Bornheim || N. Ehring || — || align=right | 6.8 km || 
|-id=633 bgcolor=#fefefe
| 14633 ||  || — || November 12, 1998 || Kushiro || S. Ueda, H. Kaneda || FLO || align=right | 2.5 km || 
|-id=634 bgcolor=#E9E9E9
| 14634 ||  || — || November 10, 1998 || Socorro || LINEAR || PAE || align=right | 10 km || 
|-id=635 bgcolor=#d6d6d6
| 14635 ||  || — || November 10, 1998 || Socorro || LINEAR || — || align=right | 5.3 km || 
|-id=636 bgcolor=#fefefe
| 14636 ||  || — || November 15, 1998 || Višnjan Observatory || K. Korlević || V || align=right | 2.7 km || 
|-id=637 bgcolor=#fefefe
| 14637 ||  || — || November 18, 1998 || Oizumi || T. Kobayashi || — || align=right | 3.1 km || 
|-id=638 bgcolor=#d6d6d6
| 14638 ||  || — || November 18, 1998 || Oizumi || T. Kobayashi || THM || align=right | 8.2 km || 
|-id=639 bgcolor=#E9E9E9
| 14639 ||  || — || November 19, 1998 || Oizumi || T. Kobayashi || MIS || align=right | 6.7 km || 
|-id=640 bgcolor=#d6d6d6
| 14640 ||  || — || November 18, 1998 || Kushiro || S. Ueda, H. Kaneda || — || align=right | 7.8 km || 
|-id=641 bgcolor=#fefefe
| 14641 ||  || — || November 18, 1998 || Kushiro || S. Ueda, H. Kaneda || — || align=right | 2.8 km || 
|-id=642 bgcolor=#fefefe
| 14642 ||  || — || November 25, 1998 || Uenohara || N. Kawasato || — || align=right | 5.8 km || 
|-id=643 bgcolor=#fefefe
| 14643 Morata ||  ||  || November 24, 1998 || Observatoire de Blauvac || R. Roy || — || align=right | 4.6 km || 
|-id=644 bgcolor=#E9E9E9
| 14644 ||  || — || December 9, 1998 || Oizumi || T. Kobayashi || — || align=right | 8.0 km || 
|-id=645 bgcolor=#fefefe
| 14645 ||  || — || December 14, 1998 || Višnjan Observatory || K. Korlević || V || align=right | 3.4 km || 
|-id=646 bgcolor=#E9E9E9
| 14646 ||  || — || December 14, 1998 || Socorro || LINEAR || — || align=right | 5.6 km || 
|-id=647 bgcolor=#d6d6d6
| 14647 ||  || — || December 14, 1998 || Socorro || LINEAR || — || align=right | 9.8 km || 
|-id=648 bgcolor=#d6d6d6
| 14648 ||  || — || December 14, 1998 || Socorro || LINEAR || — || align=right | 13 km || 
|-id=649 bgcolor=#d6d6d6
| 14649 ||  || — || December 12, 1998 || Socorro || LINEAR || — || align=right | 13 km || 
|-id=650 bgcolor=#fefefe
| 14650 ||  || — || December 17, 1998 || Oizumi || T. Kobayashi || — || align=right | 3.5 km || 
|-id=651 bgcolor=#d6d6d6
| 14651 ||  || — || December 18, 1998 || Caussols || ODAS || — || align=right | 13 km || 
|-id=652 bgcolor=#d6d6d6
| 14652 ||  || — || December 17, 1998 || Xinglong || SCAP || KOR || align=right | 5.6 km || 
|-id=653 bgcolor=#FA8072
| 14653 ||  || — || December 26, 1998 || Oizumi || T. Kobayashi || — || align=right | 3.1 km || 
|-id=654 bgcolor=#d6d6d6
| 14654 Rajivgupta ||  ||  || December 22, 1998 || Kitt Peak || Spacewatch || THM || align=right | 11 km || 
|-id=655 bgcolor=#E9E9E9
| 14655 ||  || — || December 21, 1998 || Xinglong || SCAP || PAD || align=right | 9.4 km || 
|-id=656 bgcolor=#E9E9E9
| 14656 Lijiang ||  ||  || December 29, 1998 || Xinglong || SCAP || GEF || align=right | 8.1 km || 
|-id=657 bgcolor=#E9E9E9
| 14657 ||  || — || December 26, 1998 || Višnjan Observatory || K. Korlević || — || align=right | 5.8 km || 
|-id=658 bgcolor=#d6d6d6
| 14658 ||  || — || January 13, 1999 || Višnjan Observatory || K. Korlević || EOS || align=right | 10 km || 
|-id=659 bgcolor=#E9E9E9
| 14659 Gregoriana ||  ||  || January 15, 1999 || Montelupo || M. Tombelli, G. Forti || — || align=right | 7.2 km || 
|-id=660 bgcolor=#E9E9E9
| 14660 ||  || — || January 16, 1999 || Višnjan Observatory || K. Korlević || RAF || align=right | 6.5 km || 
|-id=661 bgcolor=#E9E9E9
| 14661 ||  || — || January 23, 1999 || Višnjan Observatory || K. Korlević || — || align=right | 4.0 km || 
|-id=662 bgcolor=#E9E9E9
| 14662 ||  || — || January 22, 1999 || Oizumi || T. Kobayashi || — || align=right | 7.3 km || 
|-id=663 bgcolor=#E9E9E9
| 14663 ||  || — || January 18, 1999 || Socorro || LINEAR || — || align=right | 5.2 km || 
|-id=664 bgcolor=#d6d6d6
| 14664 Vandervelden ||  ||  || January 25, 1999 || Oohira || T. Urata || — || align=right | 14 km || 
|-id=665 bgcolor=#E9E9E9
| 14665 ||  || — || February 12, 1999 || Oohira || T. Urata || — || align=right | 7.9 km || 
|-id=666 bgcolor=#d6d6d6
| 14666 ||  || — || February 10, 1999 || Socorro || LINEAR || EOS || align=right | 9.3 km || 
|-id=667 bgcolor=#d6d6d6
| 14667 ||  || — || February 10, 1999 || Socorro || LINEAR || — || align=right | 8.8 km || 
|-id=668 bgcolor=#E9E9E9
| 14668 ||  || — || February 12, 1999 || Socorro || LINEAR || — || align=right | 9.1 km || 
|-id=669 bgcolor=#d6d6d6
| 14669 Beletic || 1999 DC ||  || February 16, 1999 || Caussols || ODAS || 3:2 || align=right | 16 km || 
|-id=670 bgcolor=#E9E9E9
| 14670 ||  || — || May 10, 1999 || Socorro || LINEAR || — || align=right | 4.6 km || 
|-id=671 bgcolor=#E9E9E9
| 14671 ||  || — || September 7, 1999 || Socorro || LINEAR || — || align=right | 9.1 km || 
|-id=672 bgcolor=#d6d6d6
| 14672 ||  || — || September 7, 1999 || Socorro || LINEAR || EOS || align=right | 10 km || 
|-id=673 bgcolor=#d6d6d6
| 14673 ||  || — || September 9, 1999 || Socorro || LINEAR || — || align=right | 8.9 km || 
|-id=674 bgcolor=#E9E9E9
| 14674 INAOE ||  ||  || October 29, 1999 || Catalina || CSS || — || align=right | 3.8 km || 
|-id=675 bgcolor=#E9E9E9
| 14675 ||  || — || November 7, 1999 || Višnjan Observatory || K. Korlević || — || align=right | 4.4 km || 
|-id=676 bgcolor=#E9E9E9
| 14676 ||  || — || November 29, 1999 || Višnjan Observatory || K. Korlević || — || align=right | 3.2 km || 
|-id=677 bgcolor=#fefefe
| 14677 || 1999 XZ || — || December 2, 1999 || Oizumi || T. Kobayashi || — || align=right | 4.1 km || 
|-id=678 bgcolor=#fefefe
| 14678 Pinney ||  ||  || December 6, 1999 || Socorro || LINEAR || NYS || align=right | 3.5 km || 
|-id=679 bgcolor=#fefefe
| 14679 Susanreed ||  ||  || December 7, 1999 || Socorro || LINEAR || NYS || align=right | 4.0 km || 
|-id=680 bgcolor=#E9E9E9
| 14680 ||  || — || December 10, 1999 || Oizumi || T. Kobayashi || RAF || align=right | 4.2 km || 
|-id=681 bgcolor=#d6d6d6
| 14681 Estellechurch ||  ||  || December 4, 1999 || Catalina || CSS || THM || align=right | 8.0 km || 
|-id=682 bgcolor=#E9E9E9
| 14682 Davidhirsch ||  ||  || December 5, 1999 || Catalina || CSS || — || align=right | 4.4 km || 
|-id=683 bgcolor=#fefefe
| 14683 Remy ||  ||  || December 8, 1999 || Socorro || LINEAR || FLO || align=right | 3.1 km || 
|-id=684 bgcolor=#fefefe
| 14684 Reyes ||  ||  || December 10, 1999 || Socorro || LINEAR || — || align=right | 3.1 km || 
|-id=685 bgcolor=#d6d6d6
| 14685 ||  || — || December 10, 1999 || Socorro || LINEAR || — || align=right | 8.4 km || 
|-id=686 bgcolor=#fefefe
| 14686 ||  || — || December 10, 1999 || Socorro || LINEAR || V || align=right | 4.6 km || 
|-id=687 bgcolor=#fefefe
| 14687 ||  || — || December 30, 1999 || Višnjan Observatory || K. Korlević, M. Jurić || — || align=right | 4.4 km || 
|-id=688 bgcolor=#fefefe
| 14688 ||  || — || January 3, 2000 || Oizumi || T. Kobayashi || — || align=right | 4.8 km || 
|-id=689 bgcolor=#fefefe
| 14689 ||  || — || January 3, 2000 || Oizumi || T. Kobayashi || — || align=right | 4.3 km || 
|-id=690 bgcolor=#C2FFFF
| 14690 ||  || — || January 3, 2000 || Socorro || LINEAR || L4 || align=right | 43 km || 
|-id=691 bgcolor=#E9E9E9
| 14691 ||  || — || January 5, 2000 || Socorro || LINEAR || EUN || align=right | 13 km || 
|-id=692 bgcolor=#d6d6d6
| 14692 ||  || — || January 3, 2000 || Socorro || LINEAR || EOS || align=right | 12 km || 
|-id=693 bgcolor=#fefefe
| 14693 Selwyn ||  ||  || January 5, 2000 || Socorro || LINEAR || NYS || align=right | 4.3 km || 
|-id=694 bgcolor=#fefefe
| 14694 Skurat ||  ||  || January 6, 2000 || Socorro || LINEAR || FLO || align=right | 2.9 km || 
|-id=695 bgcolor=#E9E9E9
| 14695 ||  || — || January 9, 2000 || Socorro || LINEAR || EUN || align=right | 6.6 km || 
|-id=696 bgcolor=#E9E9E9
| 14696 Lindawilliams ||  ||  || January 10, 2000 || Socorro || LINEAR || — || align=right | 6.1 km || 
|-id=697 bgcolor=#fefefe
| 14697 Ronsawyer ||  ||  || January 6, 2000 || Kitt Peak || Spacewatch || — || align=right | 2.3 km || 
|-id=698 bgcolor=#fefefe
| 14698 Scottyoung ||  ||  || January 3, 2000 || Kitt Peak || Spacewatch || MAS || align=right | 2.6 km || 
|-id=699 bgcolor=#E9E9E9
| 14699 Klarasmi ||  ||  || January 6, 2000 || Anderson Mesa || LONEOS || — || align=right | 16 km || 
|-id=700 bgcolor=#E9E9E9
| 14700 Johnreid ||  ||  || January 6, 2000 || Anderson Mesa || LONEOS || — || align=right | 6.3 km || 
|}

14701–14800 

|-bgcolor=#E9E9E9
| 14701 Aizu ||  ||  || January 7, 2000 || Anderson Mesa || LONEOS || — || align=right | 6.0 km || 
|-id=702 bgcolor=#d6d6d6
| 14702 Benclark ||  ||  || January 7, 2000 || Anderson Mesa || LONEOS || EOS || align=right | 9.0 km || 
|-id=703 bgcolor=#E9E9E9
| 14703 ||  || — || January 7, 2000 || Socorro || LINEAR || — || align=right | 4.7 km || 
|-id=704 bgcolor=#E9E9E9
| 14704 ||  || — || February 2, 2000 || Oizumi || T. Kobayashi || — || align=right | 7.6 km || 
|-id=705 bgcolor=#E9E9E9
| 14705 ||  || — || February 2, 2000 || Oizumi || T. Kobayashi || — || align=right | 15 km || 
|-id=706 bgcolor=#E9E9E9
| 14706 ||  || — || February 4, 2000 || Oizumi || T. Kobayashi || EUN || align=right | 7.1 km || 
|-id=707 bgcolor=#C2FFFF
| 14707 ||  || — || February 2, 2000 || Socorro || LINEAR || L4 || align=right | 26 km || 
|-id=708 bgcolor=#fefefe
| 14708 Slaven ||  ||  || February 2, 2000 || Socorro || LINEAR || — || align=right | 2.2 km || 
|-id=709 bgcolor=#E9E9E9
| 14709 ||  || — || February 2, 2000 || Socorro || LINEAR || — || align=right | 10 km || 
|-id=710 bgcolor=#fefefe
| 14710 ||  || — || February 2, 2000 || Socorro || LINEAR || — || align=right | 1.4 km || 
|-id=711 bgcolor=#E9E9E9
| 14711 ||  || — || February 2, 2000 || Socorro || LINEAR || — || align=right | 4.2 km || 
|-id=712 bgcolor=#d6d6d6
| 14712 ||  || — || February 2, 2000 || Socorro || LINEAR || — || align=right | 9.2 km || 
|-id=713 bgcolor=#E9E9E9
| 14713 ||  || — || February 2, 2000 || Socorro || LINEAR || — || align=right | 6.7 km || 
|-id=714 bgcolor=#fefefe
| 14714 ||  || — || February 4, 2000 || Socorro || LINEAR || NYS || align=right | 3.4 km || 
|-id=715 bgcolor=#d6d6d6
| 14715 ||  || — || February 7, 2000 || Socorro || LINEAR || VER || align=right | 13 km || 
|-id=716 bgcolor=#d6d6d6
| 14716 ||  || — || February 4, 2000 || Socorro || LINEAR || THM || align=right | 13 km || 
|-id=717 bgcolor=#d6d6d6
| 14717 ||  || — || February 4, 2000 || Socorro || LINEAR || — || align=right | 20 km || 
|-id=718 bgcolor=#fefefe
| 14718 ||  || — || February 4, 2000 || Socorro || LINEAR || NYS || align=right | 4.6 km || 
|-id=719 bgcolor=#fefefe
| 14719 Sobey ||  ||  || February 4, 2000 || Socorro || LINEAR || — || align=right | 3.2 km || 
|-id=720 bgcolor=#E9E9E9
| 14720 ||  || — || February 4, 2000 || Socorro || LINEAR || EUN || align=right | 8.5 km || 
|-id=721 bgcolor=#E9E9E9
| 14721 ||  || — || February 6, 2000 || Socorro || LINEAR || EUN || align=right | 5.1 km || 
|-id=722 bgcolor=#d6d6d6
| 14722 ||  || — || February 6, 2000 || Socorro || LINEAR || VER || align=right | 13 km || 
|-id=723 bgcolor=#d6d6d6
| 14723 ||  || — || February 6, 2000 || Socorro || LINEAR || — || align=right | 13 km || 
|-id=724 bgcolor=#d6d6d6
| 14724 SNO ||  ||  || February 10, 2000 || Kitt Peak || Spacewatch || KOR || align=right | 4.0 km || 
|-id=725 bgcolor=#d6d6d6
| 14725 ||  || — || February 27, 2000 || Oizumi || T. Kobayashi || — || align=right | 11 km || 
|-id=726 bgcolor=#d6d6d6
| 14726 ||  || — || February 27, 2000 || Oizumi || T. Kobayashi || — || align=right | 19 km || 
|-id=727 bgcolor=#fefefe
| 14727 Suggs ||  ||  || February 27, 2000 || Kitt Peak || Spacewatch || FLO || align=right | 1.8 km || 
|-id=728 bgcolor=#fefefe
| 14728 Schuchardt ||  ||  || February 26, 2000 || Catalina || CSS || — || align=right | 4.1 km || 
|-id=729 bgcolor=#E9E9E9
| 14729 ||  || — || February 29, 2000 || Višnjan Observatory || K. Korlević || — || align=right | 4.4 km || 
|-id=730 bgcolor=#d6d6d6
| 14730 ||  || — || February 29, 2000 || Socorro || LINEAR || — || align=right | 8.1 km || 
|-id=731 bgcolor=#d6d6d6
| 14731 ||  || — || February 29, 2000 || Socorro || LINEAR || — || align=right | 8.4 km || 
|-id=732 bgcolor=#d6d6d6
| 14732 ||  || — || February 29, 2000 || Socorro || LINEAR || THM || align=right | 9.0 km || 
|-id=733 bgcolor=#E9E9E9
| 14733 ||  || — || February 29, 2000 || Socorro || LINEAR || — || align=right | 5.8 km || 
|-id=734 bgcolor=#fefefe
| 14734 Susanstoker ||  ||  || February 29, 2000 || Socorro || LINEAR || FLO || align=right | 2.1 km || 
|-id=735 bgcolor=#fefefe
| 14735 ||  || — || February 29, 2000 || Socorro || LINEAR || FLO || align=right | 3.8 km || 
|-id=736 bgcolor=#d6d6d6
| 14736 ||  || — || February 29, 2000 || Socorro || LINEAR || EMA || align=right | 14 km || 
|-id=737 bgcolor=#E9E9E9
| 14737 ||  || — || February 29, 2000 || Socorro || LINEAR || EUN || align=right | 4.1 km || 
|-id=738 bgcolor=#d6d6d6
| 14738 ||  || — || February 29, 2000 || Socorro || LINEAR || — || align=right | 9.5 km || 
|-id=739 bgcolor=#d6d6d6
| 14739 Edgarchavez ||  ||  || March 3, 2000 || Catalina || CSS || EOS || align=right | 10 km || 
|-id=740 bgcolor=#d6d6d6
| 14740 ||  || — || March 5, 2000 || Socorro || LINEAR || — || align=right | 12 km || 
|-id=741 bgcolor=#fefefe
| 14741 Teamequinox ||  ||  || March 9, 2000 || Socorro || LINEAR || — || align=right | 2.6 km || 
|-id=742 bgcolor=#d6d6d6
| 14742 ||  || — || March 8, 2000 || Socorro || LINEAR || — || align=right | 9.8 km || 
|-id=743 bgcolor=#E9E9E9
| 14743 || 2016 P-L || — || September 24, 1960 || Palomar || PLS || — || align=right | 8.1 km || 
|-id=744 bgcolor=#E9E9E9
| 14744 || 2092 P-L || — || September 26, 1960 || Palomar || PLS || — || align=right | 5.9 km || 
|-id=745 bgcolor=#E9E9E9
| 14745 || 2154 P-L || — || September 24, 1960 || Palomar || PLS || — || align=right | 4.2 km || 
|-id=746 bgcolor=#fefefe
| 14746 || 2164 P-L || — || September 26, 1960 || Palomar || PLS || NYS || align=right | 6.2 km || 
|-id=747 bgcolor=#fefefe
| 14747 || 2541 P-L || — || September 24, 1960 || Palomar || PLS || MAS || align=right | 2.5 km || 
|-id=748 bgcolor=#E9E9E9
| 14748 || 2620 P-L || — || September 24, 1960 || Palomar || PLS || — || align=right | 7.2 km || 
|-id=749 bgcolor=#d6d6d6
| 14749 || 2626 P-L || — || September 26, 1960 || Palomar || PLS || — || align=right | 9.3 km || 
|-id=750 bgcolor=#d6d6d6
| 14750 || 2654 P-L || — || September 24, 1960 || Palomar || PLS || THM || align=right | 5.2 km || 
|-id=751 bgcolor=#d6d6d6
| 14751 || 2688 P-L || — || September 24, 1960 || Palomar || PLS || — || align=right | 5.4 km || 
|-id=752 bgcolor=#d6d6d6
| 14752 || 3005 P-L || — || September 24, 1960 || Palomar || PLS || EOS || align=right | 6.5 km || 
|-id=753 bgcolor=#E9E9E9
| 14753 || 4592 P-L || — || September 24, 1960 || Palomar || PLS || — || align=right | 3.5 km || 
|-id=754 bgcolor=#E9E9E9
| 14754 || 4806 P-L || — || September 24, 1960 || Palomar || PLS || — || align=right | 3.9 km || 
|-id=755 bgcolor=#E9E9E9
| 14755 || 6069 P-L || — || September 24, 1960 || Palomar || PLS || — || align=right | 4.9 km || 
|-id=756 bgcolor=#d6d6d6
| 14756 || 6232 P-L || — || September 24, 1960 || Palomar || PLS || — || align=right | 6.1 km || 
|-id=757 bgcolor=#E9E9E9
| 14757 || 6309 P-L || — || September 24, 1960 || Palomar || PLS || — || align=right | 2.9 km || 
|-id=758 bgcolor=#d6d6d6
| 14758 || 6519 P-L || — || September 24, 1960 || Palomar || PLS || — || align=right | 11 km || 
|-id=759 bgcolor=#fefefe
| 14759 || 6520 P-L || — || September 24, 1960 || Palomar || PLS || FLO || align=right | 2.4 km || 
|-id=760 bgcolor=#fefefe
| 14760 || 6595 P-L || — || September 24, 1960 || Palomar || PLS || MAS || align=right | 3.2 km || 
|-id=761 bgcolor=#E9E9E9
| 14761 || 6608 P-L || — || September 24, 1960 || Palomar || PLS || — || align=right | 2.7 km || 
|-id=762 bgcolor=#fefefe
| 14762 || 6647 P-L || — || September 26, 1960 || Palomar || PLS || NYS || align=right | 3.3 km || 
|-id=763 bgcolor=#fefefe
| 14763 || 6793 P-L || — || September 24, 1960 || Palomar || PLS || FLO || align=right | 2.2 km || 
|-id=764 bgcolor=#fefefe
| 14764 Kilauea || 7072 P-L ||  || October 17, 1960 || Palomar || PLS || H || align=right | 2.5 km || 
|-id=765 bgcolor=#E9E9E9
| 14765 || 9519 P-L || — || October 17, 1960 || Palomar || PLS || HOF || align=right | 7.4 km || 
|-id=766 bgcolor=#d6d6d6
| 14766 || 9594 P-L || — || October 17, 1960 || Palomar || PLS || 7:4 || align=right | 10 km || 
|-id=767 bgcolor=#fefefe
| 14767 || 1137 T-1 || — || March 25, 1971 || Palomar || PLS || — || align=right | 3.5 km || 
|-id=768 bgcolor=#d6d6d6
| 14768 || 1238 T-1 || — || March 25, 1971 || Palomar || PLS || — || align=right | 4.1 km || 
|-id=769 bgcolor=#fefefe
| 14769 || 2175 T-1 || — || March 25, 1971 || Palomar || PLS || — || align=right | 3.3 km || 
|-id=770 bgcolor=#d6d6d6
| 14770 || 2198 T-1 || — || March 25, 1971 || Palomar || PLS || THM || align=right | 7.2 km || 
|-id=771 bgcolor=#d6d6d6
| 14771 || 4105 T-1 || — || March 26, 1971 || Palomar || PLS || THM || align=right | 11 km || 
|-id=772 bgcolor=#d6d6d6
| 14772 || 4195 T-1 || — || March 26, 1971 || Palomar || PLS || KOR || align=right | 4.6 km || 
|-id=773 bgcolor=#d6d6d6
| 14773 || 4264 T-1 || — || March 26, 1971 || Palomar || PLS || TRP || align=right | 8.1 km || 
|-id=774 bgcolor=#d6d6d6
| 14774 || 4845 T-1 || — || May 13, 1971 || Palomar || PLS || slow || align=right | 13 km || 
|-id=775 bgcolor=#E9E9E9
| 14775 || 1139 T-2 || — || September 29, 1973 || Palomar || PLS || — || align=right | 6.7 km || 
|-id=776 bgcolor=#d6d6d6
| 14776 || 1282 T-2 || — || September 29, 1973 || Palomar || PLS || KOR || align=right | 5.0 km || 
|-id=777 bgcolor=#fefefe
| 14777 || 2078 T-2 || — || September 29, 1973 || Palomar || PLS || FLO || align=right | 2.5 km || 
|-id=778 bgcolor=#d6d6d6
| 14778 || 2216 T-2 || — || September 29, 1973 || Palomar || PLS || — || align=right | 9.6 km || 
|-id=779 bgcolor=#d6d6d6
| 14779 || 3072 T-2 || — || September 30, 1973 || Palomar || PLS || KOR || align=right | 6.8 km || 
|-id=780 bgcolor=#E9E9E9
| 14780 || 1078 T-3 || — || October 17, 1977 || Palomar || PLS || MAR || align=right | 4.7 km || 
|-id=781 bgcolor=#d6d6d6
| 14781 || 1107 T-3 || — || October 17, 1977 || Palomar || PLS || — || align=right | 7.5 km || 
|-id=782 bgcolor=#fefefe
| 14782 || 3149 T-3 || — || October 16, 1977 || Palomar || PLS || NYS || align=right | 1.7 km || 
|-id=783 bgcolor=#d6d6d6
| 14783 || 3152 T-3 || — || October 16, 1977 || Palomar || PLS || KOR || align=right | 4.9 km || 
|-id=784 bgcolor=#fefefe
| 14784 || 3268 T-3 || — || October 16, 1977 || Palomar || PLS || V || align=right | 1.4 km || 
|-id=785 bgcolor=#fefefe
| 14785 || 3508 T-3 || — || October 16, 1977 || Palomar || PLS || V || align=right | 2.6 km || 
|-id=786 bgcolor=#fefefe
| 14786 || 4052 T-3 || — || October 16, 1977 || Palomar || PLS || V || align=right | 2.3 km || 
|-id=787 bgcolor=#d6d6d6
| 14787 || 5038 T-3 || — || October 16, 1977 || Palomar || PLS || EOS || align=right | 7.7 km || 
|-id=788 bgcolor=#d6d6d6
| 14788 || 5172 T-3 || — || October 16, 1977 || Palomar || PLS || EOS || align=right | 8.2 km || 
|-id=789 bgcolor=#d6d6d6
| 14789 GAISH ||  ||  || October 8, 1969 || Nauchnij || L. I. Chernykh || — || align=right | 15 km || 
|-id=790 bgcolor=#E9E9E9
| 14790 Beletskij || 1970 OF ||  || July 30, 1970 || Nauchnij || T. M. Smirnova || — || align=right | 10 km || 
|-id=791 bgcolor=#C2FFFF
| 14791 Atreus || 1973 SU ||  || September 19, 1973 || Palomar || PLS || L4 || align=right | 22 km || 
|-id=792 bgcolor=#C2FFFF
| 14792 Thyestes ||  ||  || September 24, 1973 || Palomar || PLS || L4 || align=right | 19 km || 
|-id=793 bgcolor=#fefefe
| 14793 ||  || — || September 30, 1975 || Palomar || S. J. Bus || V || align=right | 2.0 km || 
|-id=794 bgcolor=#d6d6d6
| 14794 Konetskiy ||  ||  || September 24, 1976 || Nauchnij || N. S. Chernykh || EOS || align=right | 7.8 km || 
|-id=795 bgcolor=#d6d6d6
| 14795 Syoyou ||  ||  || March 12, 1977 || Kiso || H. Kosai, K. Furukawa || — || align=right | 10 km || 
|-id=796 bgcolor=#d6d6d6
| 14796 ||  || — || December 7, 1977 || Palomar || S. J. Bus || — || align=right | 13 km || 
|-id=797 bgcolor=#d6d6d6
| 14797 ||  || — || December 7, 1977 || Palomar || S. J. Bus || KOR || align=right | 6.0 km || 
|-id=798 bgcolor=#fefefe
| 14798 ||  || — || October 27, 1978 || Palomar || C. M. Olmstead || V || align=right | 3.3 km || 
|-id=799 bgcolor=#fefefe
| 14799 ||  || — || June 25, 1979 || Siding Spring || E. F. Helin, S. J. Bus || NYS || align=right | 4.3 km || 
|-id=800 bgcolor=#E9E9E9
| 14800 ||  || — || June 25, 1979 || Siding Spring || E. F. Helin, S. J. Bus || — || align=right | 3.3 km || 
|}

14801–14900 

|-bgcolor=#E9E9E9
| 14801 ||  || — || August 15, 1980 || Siding Spring || Edinburgh Obs. || — || align=right | 5.1 km || 
|-id=802 bgcolor=#E9E9E9
| 14802 ||  || — || February 28, 1981 || Siding Spring || S. J. Bus || — || align=right | 6.6 km || 
|-id=803 bgcolor=#fefefe
| 14803 ||  || — || March 1, 1981 || Siding Spring || S. J. Bus || — || align=right | 4.7 km || 
|-id=804 bgcolor=#fefefe
| 14804 ||  || — || March 1, 1981 || Siding Spring || S. J. Bus || — || align=right | 2.7 km || 
|-id=805 bgcolor=#fefefe
| 14805 ||  || — || March 1, 1981 || Siding Spring || S. J. Bus || fast? || align=right | 3.1 km || 
|-id=806 bgcolor=#E9E9E9
| 14806 ||  || — || March 2, 1981 || Siding Spring || S. J. Bus || — || align=right | 4.1 km || 
|-id=807 bgcolor=#E9E9E9
| 14807 ||  || — || March 2, 1981 || Siding Spring || S. J. Bus || DOR || align=right | 6.3 km || 
|-id=808 bgcolor=#E9E9E9
| 14808 ||  || — || March 2, 1981 || Siding Spring || S. J. Bus || — || align=right | 7.2 km || 
|-id=809 bgcolor=#fefefe
| 14809 ||  || — || March 6, 1981 || Siding Spring || S. J. Bus || — || align=right | 3.7 km || 
|-id=810 bgcolor=#fefefe
| 14810 ||  || — || March 2, 1981 || Siding Spring || S. J. Bus || — || align=right | 4.2 km || 
|-id=811 bgcolor=#E9E9E9
| 14811 ||  || — || March 2, 1981 || Siding Spring || S. J. Bus || DOR || align=right | 11 km || 
|-id=812 bgcolor=#fefefe
| 14812 Rosario ||  ||  || May 9, 1981 || El Leoncito || Félix Aguilar Obs. || — || align=right | 4.9 km || 
|-id=813 bgcolor=#fefefe
| 14813 ||  || — || August 23, 1981 || La Silla || H. Debehogne || — || align=right | 2.3 km || 
|-id=814 bgcolor=#E9E9E9
| 14814 Gurij ||  ||  || September 7, 1981 || Nauchnij || L. G. Karachkina || — || align=right | 8.3 km || 
|-id=815 bgcolor=#fefefe
| 14815 Rutberg ||  ||  || October 7, 1981 || Nauchnij || T. M. Smirnova || slow || align=right | 3.7 km || 
|-id=816 bgcolor=#fefefe
| 14816 ||  || — || October 24, 1981 || Palomar || S. J. Bus || — || align=right | 3.5 km || 
|-id=817 bgcolor=#fefefe
| 14817 ||  || — || March 21, 1982 || La Silla || H. Debehogne || NYS || align=right | 2.2 km || 
|-id=818 bgcolor=#d6d6d6
| 14818 Mindeli ||  ||  || October 21, 1982 || Nauchnij || L. G. Karachkina || — || align=right | 15 km || 
|-id=819 bgcolor=#E9E9E9
| 14819 Nikolaylaverov ||  ||  || October 25, 1982 || Nauchnij || L. V. Zhuravleva || slow || align=right | 3.5 km || 
|-id=820 bgcolor=#fefefe
| 14820 Aizuyaichi ||  ||  || November 14, 1982 || Kiso || H. Kosai, K. Furukawa || — || align=right | 2.7 km || 
|-id=821 bgcolor=#fefefe
| 14821 Motaeno ||  ||  || November 14, 1982 || Kiso || H. Kosai, K. Furukawa || — || align=right | 2.9 km || 
|-id=822 bgcolor=#d6d6d6
| 14822 ||  || — || September 21, 1984 || La Silla || H. Debehogne || — || align=right | 17 km || 
|-id=823 bgcolor=#fefefe
| 14823 ||  || — || September 21, 1984 || La Silla || H. Debehogne || NYS || align=right | 3.2 km || 
|-id=824 bgcolor=#fefefe
| 14824 ||  || — || February 13, 1985 || La Silla || H. Debehogne || — || align=right | 3.5 km || 
|-id=825 bgcolor=#E9E9E9
| 14825 Fieber-Beyer || 1985 RQ ||  || September 14, 1985 || Anderson Mesa || E. Bowell || — || align=right | 3.1 km || 
|-id=826 bgcolor=#d6d6d6
| 14826 Nicollier ||  ||  || September 16, 1985 || Zimmerwald || P. Wild || — || align=right | 12 km || 
|-id=827 bgcolor=#FFC2E0
| 14827 Hypnos || 1986 JK ||  || May 5, 1986 || Palomar || C. S. Shoemaker, E. M. Shoemaker || APOPHAcritical || align=right data-sort-value="0.9" | 900 m || 
|-id=828 bgcolor=#fefefe
| 14828 ||  || — || August 27, 1986 || La Silla || H. Debehogne || NYS || align=right | 3.3 km || 
|-id=829 bgcolor=#fefefe
| 14829 Povalyaeva ||  ||  || October 3, 1986 || Nauchnij || L. G. Karachkina || — || align=right | 4.8 km || 
|-id=830 bgcolor=#d6d6d6
| 14830 ||  || — || December 5, 1986 || Harvard Observatory || Oak Ridge Observatory || — || align=right | 8.3 km || 
|-id=831 bgcolor=#E9E9E9
| 14831 Gentileschi ||  ||  || January 22, 1987 || La Silla || E. W. Elst || EUN || align=right | 5.3 km || 
|-id=832 bgcolor=#fefefe
| 14832 Alechinsky ||  ||  || August 27, 1987 || La Silla || E. W. Elst || V || align=right | 4.4 km || 
|-id=833 bgcolor=#fefefe
| 14833 Vilenius ||  ||  || September 21, 1987 || Anderson Mesa || E. Bowell || FLO || align=right | 3.1 km || 
|-id=834 bgcolor=#fefefe
| 14834 Isaev ||  ||  || September 17, 1987 || Nauchnij || L. I. Chernykh || — || align=right | 2.9 km || 
|-id=835 bgcolor=#fefefe
| 14835 Holdridge ||  ||  || November 26, 1987 || Palomar || C. S. Shoemaker, E. M. Shoemaker || PHO || align=right | 6.7 km || 
|-id=836 bgcolor=#d6d6d6
| 14836 Maxfrisch || 1988 CY ||  || February 14, 1988 || Tautenburg Observatory || F. Börngen || — || align=right | 14 km || 
|-id=837 bgcolor=#E9E9E9
| 14837 ||  || — || September 8, 1988 || Brorfelde || P. Jensen || — || align=right | 9.1 km || 
|-id=838 bgcolor=#fefefe
| 14838 ||  || — || September 6, 1988 || La Silla || H. Debehogne || V || align=right | 2.8 km || 
|-id=839 bgcolor=#fefefe
| 14839 ||  || — || September 11, 1988 || Smolyan || V. G. Shkodrov || — || align=right | 2.7 km || 
|-id=840 bgcolor=#fefefe
| 14840 ||  || — || September 14, 1988 || Cerro Tololo || S. J. Bus || — || align=right | 1.8 km || 
|-id=841 bgcolor=#fefefe
| 14841 || 1988 TU || — || October 13, 1988 || Kushiro || S. Ueda, H. Kaneda || — || align=right | 3.8 km || 
|-id=842 bgcolor=#E9E9E9
| 14842 ||  || — || October 13, 1988 || Kushiro || S. Ueda, H. Kaneda || EUN || align=right | 6.1 km || 
|-id=843 bgcolor=#fefefe
| 14843 Tanna ||  ||  || November 12, 1988 || Gekko || Y. Oshima || FLO || align=right | 2.1 km || 
|-id=844 bgcolor=#fefefe
| 14844 ||  || — || November 14, 1988 || Kushiro || S. Ueda, H. Kaneda || FLO || align=right | 3.6 km || 
|-id=845 bgcolor=#d6d6d6
| 14845 Hegel ||  ||  || November 3, 1988 || Tautenburg Observatory || F. Börngen || 3:2 || align=right | 14 km || 
|-id=846 bgcolor=#fefefe
| 14846 Lampedusa || 1989 BH ||  || January 29, 1989 || Bologna || San Vittore Obs. || — || align=right | 5.8 km || 
|-id=847 bgcolor=#fefefe
| 14847 ||  || — || February 4, 1989 || La Silla || E. W. Elst || — || align=right | 2.1 km || 
|-id=848 bgcolor=#d6d6d6
| 14848 ||  || — || April 3, 1989 || La Silla || E. W. Elst || EOS || align=right | 6.4 km || 
|-id=849 bgcolor=#fefefe
| 14849 ||  || — || April 3, 1989 || La Silla || E. W. Elst || NYS || align=right | 7.2 km || 
|-id=850 bgcolor=#fefefe
| 14850 Nagashimacho || 1989 QH ||  || August 29, 1989 || Kitami || K. Endate, K. Watanabe || — || align=right | 3.4 km || 
|-id=851 bgcolor=#fefefe
| 14851 || 1989 SD || — || September 23, 1989 || Kani || Y. Mizuno, T. Furuta || — || align=right | 2.9 km || 
|-id=852 bgcolor=#E9E9E9
| 14852 || 1989 SE || — || September 23, 1989 || Kani || Y. Mizuno, T. Furuta || — || align=right | 3.9 km || 
|-id=853 bgcolor=#E9E9E9
| 14853 Shimokawa || 1989 SX ||  || September 30, 1989 || Kitami || K. Endate, K. Watanabe || — || align=right | 7.7 km || 
|-id=854 bgcolor=#E9E9E9
| 14854 ||  || — || September 26, 1989 || La Silla || E. W. Elst || — || align=right | 3.8 km || 
|-id=855 bgcolor=#E9E9E9
| 14855 ||  || — || September 25, 1989 || La Silla || H. Debehogne || — || align=right | 5.5 km || 
|-id=856 bgcolor=#E9E9E9
| 14856 ||  || — || September 26, 1989 || Calar Alto || J. M. Baur, K. Birkle || EUN || align=right | 4.3 km || 
|-id=857 bgcolor=#E9E9E9
| 14857 || 1989 TT || — || October 1, 1989 || Palomar || E. F. Helin || — || align=right | 5.1 km || 
|-id=858 bgcolor=#E9E9E9
| 14858 ||  || — || October 27, 1989 || Palomar || E. F. Helin || EUN || align=right | 5.3 km || 
|-id=859 bgcolor=#E9E9E9
| 14859 ||  || — || November 25, 1989 || Kushiro || S. Ueda, H. Kaneda || — || align=right | 4.3 km || 
|-id=860 bgcolor=#E9E9E9
| 14860 ||  || — || November 27, 1989 || Gekko || Y. Oshima || — || align=right | 8.6 km || 
|-id=861 bgcolor=#E9E9E9
| 14861 ||  || — || February 24, 1990 || La Silla || H. Debehogne || WIT || align=right | 9.4 km || 
|-id=862 bgcolor=#fefefe
| 14862 ||  || — || March 2, 1990 || La Silla || E. W. Elst || — || align=right | 2.9 km || 
|-id=863 bgcolor=#fefefe
| 14863 || 1990 OK || — || July 18, 1990 || Palomar || E. F. Helin || — || align=right | 3.5 km || 
|-id=864 bgcolor=#fefefe
| 14864 ||  || — || August 23, 1990 || Palomar || H. E. Holt || NYS || align=right | 2.4 km || 
|-id=865 bgcolor=#E9E9E9
| 14865 ||  || — || August 20, 1990 || La Silla || E. W. Elst || — || align=right | 3.6 km || 
|-id=866 bgcolor=#d6d6d6
| 14866 ||  || — || September 14, 1990 || Palomar || H. E. Holt || — || align=right | 9.0 km || 
|-id=867 bgcolor=#d6d6d6
| 14867 ||  || — || September 15, 1990 || Palomar || H. E. Holt || HYG || align=right | 13 km || 
|-id=868 bgcolor=#fefefe
| 14868 ||  || — || September 13, 1990 || La Silla || H. Debehogne || — || align=right | 5.8 km || 
|-id=869 bgcolor=#fefefe
| 14869 ||  || — || September 22, 1990 || La Silla || E. W. Elst || NYS || align=right | 5.9 km || 
|-id=870 bgcolor=#fefefe
| 14870 ||  || — || September 24, 1990 || La Silla || H. Debehogne || — || align=right | 5.4 km || 
|-id=871 bgcolor=#d6d6d6
| 14871 Pyramus ||  ||  || October 13, 1990 || Tautenburg Observatory || L. D. Schmadel, F. Börngen || 2:1J || align=right | 9.2 km || 
|-id=872 bgcolor=#fefefe
| 14872 Hoher List || 1990 UR ||  || October 23, 1990 || Hoher List || E. W. Elst || NYS || align=right | 4.7 km || 
|-id=873 bgcolor=#fefefe
| 14873 Shoyo ||  ||  || October 28, 1990 || Minami-Oda || K. Kawanishi, M. Sugano || — || align=right | 5.3 km || 
|-id=874 bgcolor=#fefefe
| 14874 ||  || — || October 16, 1990 || La Silla || E. W. Elst || — || align=right | 4.4 km || 
|-id=875 bgcolor=#fefefe
| 14875 ||  || — || November 18, 1990 || La Silla || E. W. Elst || — || align=right | 3.9 km || 
|-id=876 bgcolor=#fefefe
| 14876 Dampier ||  ||  || November 18, 1990 || La Silla || E. W. Elst || V || align=right | 3.6 km || 
|-id=877 bgcolor=#d6d6d6
| 14877 Zauberflöte ||  ||  || November 19, 1990 || La Silla || E. W. Elst || — || align=right | 11 km || 
|-id=878 bgcolor=#fefefe
| 14878 ||  || — || November 19, 1990 || La Silla || E. W. Elst || NYS || align=right | 6.3 km || 
|-id=879 bgcolor=#E9E9E9
| 14879 ||  || — || January 7, 1991 || Siding Spring || R. H. McNaught || — || align=right | 4.3 km || 
|-id=880 bgcolor=#E9E9E9
| 14880 Moa ||  ||  || February 7, 1991 || Geisei || T. Seki || — || align=right | 4.2 km || 
|-id=881 bgcolor=#fefefe
| 14881 || 1991 PK || — || August 5, 1991 || Palomar || H. E. Holt || — || align=right | 2.2 km || 
|-id=882 bgcolor=#d6d6d6
| 14882 ||  || — || August 9, 1991 || Palomar || H. E. Holt || — || align=right | 6.2 km || 
|-id=883 bgcolor=#d6d6d6
| 14883 ||  || — || August 7, 1991 || Palomar || H. E. Holt || — || align=right | 9.3 km || 
|-id=884 bgcolor=#fefefe
| 14884 ||  || — || August 7, 1991 || Palomar || H. E. Holt || — || align=right | 3.8 km || 
|-id=885 bgcolor=#d6d6d6
| 14885 Paskoff ||  ||  || September 6, 1991 || Haute-Provence || E. W. Elst || — || align=right | 10 km || 
|-id=886 bgcolor=#fefefe
| 14886 ||  || — || September 11, 1991 || Palomar || H. E. Holt || — || align=right | 6.2 km || 
|-id=887 bgcolor=#d6d6d6
| 14887 ||  || — || September 15, 1991 || Palomar || H. E. Holt || THM || align=right | 8.6 km || 
|-id=888 bgcolor=#fefefe
| 14888 Kanazawashi ||  ||  || September 30, 1991 || Kitami || K. Endate, K. Watanabe || — || align=right | 3.0 km || 
|-id=889 bgcolor=#d6d6d6
| 14889 ||  || — || November 5, 1991 || Dynic || A. Sugie || HYG || align=right | 14 km || 
|-id=890 bgcolor=#fefefe
| 14890 ||  || — || November 4, 1991 || Palomar || E. F. Helin || PHO || align=right | 3.5 km || 
|-id=891 bgcolor=#fefefe
| 14891 ||  || — || November 5, 1991 || Kiyosato || S. Otomo || NYS || align=right | 8.0 km || 
|-id=892 bgcolor=#fefefe
| 14892 ||  || — || November 4, 1991 || Kiyosato || S. Otomo || — || align=right | 4.2 km || 
|-id=893 bgcolor=#fefefe
| 14893 ||  || — || February 29, 1992 || La Silla || UESAC || NYS || align=right | 5.1 km || 
|-id=894 bgcolor=#d6d6d6
| 14894 ||  || — || March 2, 1992 || La Silla || UESAC || KOR || align=right | 3.5 km || 
|-id=895 bgcolor=#fefefe
| 14895 ||  || — || March 2, 1992 || La Silla || UESAC || — || align=right | 3.8 km || 
|-id=896 bgcolor=#fefefe
| 14896 ||  || — || March 8, 1992 || La Silla || UESAC || — || align=right | 2.2 km || 
|-id=897 bgcolor=#d6d6d6
| 14897 ||  || — || April 6, 1992 || La Silla || E. W. Elst || KOR || align=right | 4.0 km || 
|-id=898 bgcolor=#E9E9E9
| 14898 ||  || — || May 7, 1992 || La Silla || H. Debehogne || — || align=right | 4.0 km || 
|-id=899 bgcolor=#E9E9E9
| 14899 || 1992 LS || — || June 3, 1992 || Palomar || G. J. Leonard || — || align=right | 4.1 km || 
|-id=900 bgcolor=#d6d6d6
| 14900 ||  || — || September 2, 1992 || La Silla || E. W. Elst || — || align=right | 4.4 km || 
|}

14901–15000 

|-bgcolor=#E9E9E9
| 14901 Hidatakayama || 1992 SH ||  || September 21, 1992 || Kitami || M. Yanai, K. Watanabe || EUN || align=right | 6.6 km || 
|-id=902 bgcolor=#d6d6d6
| 14902 Miyairi ||  ||  || January 17, 1993 || Yatsugatake || Y. Kushida, O. Muramatsu || EOS || align=right | 12 km || 
|-id=903 bgcolor=#fefefe
| 14903 ||  || — || February 25, 1993 || Kushiro || S. Ueda, H. Kaneda || — || align=right | 3.3 km || 
|-id=904 bgcolor=#fefefe
| 14904 ||  || — || March 17, 1993 || La Silla || UESAC || FLO || align=right | 2.8 km || 
|-id=905 bgcolor=#fefefe
| 14905 ||  || — || March 21, 1993 || La Silla || UESAC || — || align=right | 2.5 km || 
|-id=906 bgcolor=#fefefe
| 14906 ||  || — || July 12, 1993 || La Silla || E. W. Elst || NYS || align=right | 5.3 km || 
|-id=907 bgcolor=#fefefe
| 14907 ||  || — || July 20, 1993 || La Silla || E. W. Elst || — || align=right | 4.9 km || 
|-id=908 bgcolor=#fefefe
| 14908 ||  || — || July 20, 1993 || La Silla || E. W. Elst || NYS || align=right | 2.2 km || 
|-id=909 bgcolor=#E9E9E9
| 14909 Kamchatka ||  ||  || August 14, 1993 || Caussols || E. W. Elst || EUN || align=right | 5.4 km || 
|-id=910 bgcolor=#E9E9E9
| 14910 ||  || — || August 18, 1993 || Caussols || E. W. Elst || — || align=right | 7.4 km || 
|-id=911 bgcolor=#E9E9E9
| 14911 Fukamatsu ||  ||  || September 15, 1993 || Kitami || K. Endate, K. Watanabe || EUN || align=right | 4.4 km || 
|-id=912 bgcolor=#E9E9E9
| 14912 ||  || — || September 12, 1993 || Palomar || PCAS || — || align=right | 6.5 km || 
|-id=913 bgcolor=#E9E9E9
| 14913 ||  || — || September 15, 1993 || La Silla || E. W. Elst || — || align=right | 3.3 km || 
|-id=914 bgcolor=#E9E9E9
| 14914 Moreux ||  ||  || October 9, 1993 || La Silla || E. W. Elst || — || align=right | 3.3 km || 
|-id=915 bgcolor=#E9E9E9
| 14915 ||  || — || October 20, 1993 || La Silla || E. W. Elst || MAR || align=right | 4.2 km || 
|-id=916 bgcolor=#E9E9E9
| 14916 ||  || — || November 10, 1993 || Siding Spring || G. J. Garradd || PAL || align=right | 7.6 km || 
|-id=917 bgcolor=#d6d6d6
| 14917 Taco ||  ||  || January 8, 1994 || Kitt Peak || Spacewatch || — || align=right | 9.4 km || 
|-id=918 bgcolor=#d6d6d6
| 14918 ||  || — || January 21, 1994 || Mérida || O. A. Naranjo || — || align=right | 8.6 km || 
|-id=919 bgcolor=#fefefe
| 14919 Robertohaver || 1994 PG ||  || August 6, 1994 || San Marcello || A. Boattini, M. Tombelli || — || align=right | 4.2 km || 
|-id=920 bgcolor=#fefefe
| 14920 ||  || — || August 12, 1994 || La Silla || E. W. Elst || FLOslow || align=right | 4.7 km || 
|-id=921 bgcolor=#fefefe
| 14921 || 1994 QA || — || August 16, 1994 || Siding Spring || G. J. Garradd || PHO || align=right | 3.7 km || 
|-id=922 bgcolor=#fefefe
| 14922 Ohyama ||  ||  || October 2, 1994 || Kitami || K. Endate, K. Watanabe || — || align=right | 2.7 km || 
|-id=923 bgcolor=#fefefe
| 14923 ||  || — || October 7, 1994 || Palomar || K. J. Lawrence || PHO || align=right | 4.9 km || 
|-id=924 bgcolor=#fefefe
| 14924 || 1994 VZ || — || November 3, 1994 || Nachi-Katsuura || Y. Shimizu, T. Urata || V || align=right | 2.7 km || 
|-id=925 bgcolor=#fefefe
| 14925 Naoko ||  ||  || November 4, 1994 || Kitami || K. Endate, K. Watanabe || FLO || align=right | 3.3 km || 
|-id=926 bgcolor=#fefefe
| 14926 Hoshide ||  ||  || November 4, 1994 || Kitami || K. Endate, K. Watanabe || — || align=right | 3.4 km || 
|-id=927 bgcolor=#fefefe
| 14927 Satoshi ||  ||  || November 1, 1994 || Kitami || K. Endate, K. Watanabe || FLO || align=right | 4.4 km || 
|-id=928 bgcolor=#fefefe
| 14928 ||  || — || November 27, 1994 || Oizumi || T. Kobayashi || MAS || align=right | 3.1 km || 
|-id=929 bgcolor=#E9E9E9
| 14929 ||  || — || November 27, 1994 || Oizumi || T. Kobayashi || — || align=right | 2.9 km || 
|-id=930 bgcolor=#E9E9E9
| 14930 ||  || — || November 28, 1994 || Kushiro || S. Ueda, H. Kaneda || — || align=right | 3.3 km || 
|-id=931 bgcolor=#E9E9E9
| 14931 ||  || — || November 27, 1994 || Uto || F. Uto || EUN || align=right | 7.1 km || 
|-id=932 bgcolor=#E9E9E9
| 14932 || 1994 YC || — || December 24, 1994 || Oizumi || T. Kobayashi || — || align=right | 4.4 km || 
|-id=933 bgcolor=#E9E9E9
| 14933 || 1994 YX || — || December 28, 1994 || Oizumi || T. Kobayashi || — || align=right | 3.9 km || 
|-id=934 bgcolor=#E9E9E9
| 14934 || 1995 BP || — || January 23, 1995 || Oizumi || T. Kobayashi || — || align=right | 7.8 km || 
|-id=935 bgcolor=#E9E9E9
| 14935 ||  || — || January 25, 1995 || Oizumi || T. Kobayashi || MIT || align=right | 9.8 km || 
|-id=936 bgcolor=#E9E9E9
| 14936 ||  || — || January 27, 1995 || Nachi-Katsuura || Y. Shimizu, T. Urata || MAR || align=right | 6.5 km || 
|-id=937 bgcolor=#E9E9E9
| 14937 Thirsk ||  ||  || February 1, 1995 || Kitt Peak || Spacewatch || — || align=right | 3.3 km || 
|-id=938 bgcolor=#E9E9E9
| 14938 || 1995 DN || — || February 21, 1995 || Oizumi || T. Kobayashi || GEF || align=right | 7.4 km || 
|-id=939 bgcolor=#E9E9E9
| 14939 Norikura ||  ||  || February 21, 1995 || Kuma Kogen || A. Nakamura || MRX || align=right | 2.5 km || 
|-id=940 bgcolor=#E9E9E9
| 14940 Freiligrath ||  ||  || March 4, 1995 || Tautenburg Observatory || F. Börngen || — || align=right | 5.4 km || 
|-id=941 bgcolor=#E9E9E9
| 14941 Tomswift ||  ||  || March 23, 1995 || Kitt Peak || Spacewatch || GEF || align=right | 3.8 km || 
|-id=942 bgcolor=#d6d6d6
| 14942 Stevebaker || 1995 MA ||  || June 21, 1995 || Haleakala || AMOS || URS || align=right | 11 km || 
|-id=943 bgcolor=#fefefe
| 14943 ||  || — || November 15, 1995 || Xinglong || SCAP || FLO || align=right | 2.6 km || 
|-id=944 bgcolor=#fefefe
| 14944 || 1995 YV || — || December 19, 1995 || Oizumi || T. Kobayashi || FLO || align=right | 2.7 km || 
|-id=945 bgcolor=#fefefe
| 14945 ||  || — || December 27, 1995 || Oizumi || T. Kobayashi || — || align=right | 3.5 km || 
|-id=946 bgcolor=#fefefe
| 14946 ||  || — || January 13, 1996 || Oizumi || T. Kobayashi || — || align=right | 2.4 km || 
|-id=947 bgcolor=#fefefe
| 14947 Luigibussolino ||  ||  || January 15, 1996 || Asiago || M. Tombelli, U. Munari || FLO || align=right | 2.3 km || 
|-id=948 bgcolor=#fefefe
| 14948 Bartuška || 1996 BA ||  || January 16, 1996 || Kleť || J. Tichá, M. Tichý || FLO || align=right | 2.8 km || 
|-id=949 bgcolor=#fefefe
| 14949 ||  || — || January 24, 1996 || Oizumi || T. Kobayashi || V || align=right | 2.9 km || 
|-id=950 bgcolor=#fefefe
| 14950 ||  || — || January 18, 1996 || Kushiro || S. Ueda, H. Kaneda || FLO || align=right | 6.2 km || 
|-id=951 bgcolor=#fefefe
| 14951 ||  || — || January 26, 1996 || Oizumi || T. Kobayashi || — || align=right | 4.8 km || 
|-id=952 bgcolor=#fefefe
| 14952 || 1996 CQ || — || February 1, 1996 || Xinglong || SCAP || — || align=right | 4.5 km || 
|-id=953 bgcolor=#fefefe
| 14953 Bevilacqua ||  ||  || February 13, 1996 || Asiago || M. Tombelli, G. Forti || — || align=right | 2.3 km || 
|-id=954 bgcolor=#fefefe
| 14954 || 1996 DL || — || February 16, 1996 || Haleakala || NEAT || FLO || align=right | 1.9 km || 
|-id=955 bgcolor=#fefefe
| 14955 || 1996 DX || — || February 21, 1996 || Oizumi || T. Kobayashi || NYS || align=right | 3.3 km || 
|-id=956 bgcolor=#fefefe
| 14956 ||  || — || February 22, 1996 || Oizumi || T. Kobayashi || V || align=right | 3.4 km || 
|-id=957 bgcolor=#E9E9E9
| 14957 ||  || — || April 20, 1996 || La Silla || E. W. Elst || — || align=right | 4.0 km || 
|-id=958 bgcolor=#E9E9E9
| 14958 ||  || — || May 15, 1996 || Haleakala || NEAT || — || align=right | 5.8 km || 
|-id=959 bgcolor=#fefefe
| 14959 TRIUMF ||  ||  || May 9, 1996 || Kitt Peak || Spacewatch || — || align=right | 7.0 km || 
|-id=960 bgcolor=#E9E9E9
| 14960 Yule || 1996 KO ||  || May 21, 1996 || Prescott || P. G. Comba || — || align=right | 3.9 km || 
|-id=961 bgcolor=#fefefe
| 14961 d'Auteroche ||  ||  || June 8, 1996 || La Silla || E. W. Elst || — || align=right | 7.0 km || 
|-id=962 bgcolor=#d6d6d6
| 14962 Masanoriabe ||  ||  || October 9, 1996 || Nanyo || T. Okuni || ALA || align=right | 26 km || 
|-id=963 bgcolor=#d6d6d6
| 14963 Toshikazu ||  ||  || October 11, 1996 || Nanyo || T. Okuni || THM || align=right | 12 km || 
|-id=964 bgcolor=#d6d6d6
| 14964 Robertobacci || 1996 VS ||  || November 2, 1996 || San Marcello || L. Tesi, G. Cattani || — || align=right | 8.2 km || 
|-id=965 bgcolor=#fefefe
| 14965 Bonk || 1997 KC ||  || May 24, 1997 || Bornheim || N. Ehring || — || align=right | 4.6 km || 
|-id=966 bgcolor=#fefefe
| 14966 Jurijvega ||  ||  || July 30, 1997 || Črni Vrh || H. Mikuž || — || align=right | 2.3 km || 
|-id=967 bgcolor=#E9E9E9
| 14967 Madrid ||  ||  || August 6, 1997 || Majorca || Á. López J., R. Pacheco || — || align=right | 3.6 km || 
|-id=968 bgcolor=#E9E9E9
| 14968 Kubáček || 1997 QG ||  || August 23, 1997 || Modra || A. Galád, A. Pravda || — || align=right | 4.8 km || 
|-id=969 bgcolor=#fefefe
| 14969 Willacather ||  ||  || August 28, 1997 || Lime Creek || R. Linderholm || — || align=right | 3.3 km || 
|-id=970 bgcolor=#E9E9E9
| 14970 ||  || — || August 25, 1997 || Dynic || A. Sugie || HOF || align=right | 3.5 km || 
|-id=971 bgcolor=#E9E9E9
| 14971 ||  || — || August 30, 1997 || Caussols || ODAS || — || align=right | 8.9 km || 
|-id=972 bgcolor=#fefefe
| 14972 Olihainaut ||  ||  || August 30, 1997 || Caussols || ODAS || — || align=right | 3.2 km || 
|-id=973 bgcolor=#E9E9E9
| 14973 Rossirosina || 1997 RZ ||  || September 1, 1997 || San Marcello || A. Boattini || — || align=right | 9.6 km || 
|-id=974 bgcolor=#E9E9E9
| 14974 Počátky ||  ||  || September 22, 1997 || Kleť || M. Tichý || — || align=right | 4.0 km || 
|-id=975 bgcolor=#E9E9E9
| 14975 Serasin ||  ||  || September 24, 1997 || Farra d'Isonzo || Farra d'Isonzo || — || align=right | 4.8 km || 
|-id=976 bgcolor=#d6d6d6
| 14976 Josefčapek ||  ||  || September 27, 1997 || Ondřejov || P. Pravec || HYG || align=right | 6.6 km || 
|-id=977 bgcolor=#d6d6d6
| 14977 Bressler ||  ||  || September 26, 1997 || Linz || E. Meyer || KOR || align=right | 4.9 km || 
|-id=978 bgcolor=#d6d6d6
| 14978 ||  || — || September 30, 1997 || Uenohara || N. Kawasato || — || align=right | 7.7 km || 
|-id=979 bgcolor=#E9E9E9
| 14979 ||  || — || October 3, 1997 || Caussols || ODAS || — || align=right | 4.9 km || 
|-id=980 bgcolor=#d6d6d6
| 14980 Gustavbrom ||  ||  || October 5, 1997 || Ondřejov || L. Kotková || slow || align=right | 6.8 km || 
|-id=981 bgcolor=#d6d6d6
| 14981 Uenoiwakura ||  ||  || October 6, 1997 || Kitami || K. Endate, K. Watanabe || — || align=right | 5.3 km || 
|-id=982 bgcolor=#FA8072
| 14982 ||  || — || October 8, 1997 || Gekko || T. Kagawa, T. Urata || — || align=right | 3.8 km || 
|-id=983 bgcolor=#E9E9E9
| 14983 ||  || — || October 12, 1997 || Rand || G. R. Viscome || — || align=right | 3.4 km || 
|-id=984 bgcolor=#E9E9E9
| 14984 ||  || — || October 11, 1997 || Kushiro || S. Ueda, H. Kaneda || EUN || align=right | 8.1 km || 
|-id=985 bgcolor=#d6d6d6
| 14985 ||  || — || October 25, 1997 || Oohira || T. Urata || — || align=right | 5.5 km || 
|-id=986 bgcolor=#E9E9E9
| 14986 ||  || — || October 26, 1997 || Oizumi || T. Kobayashi || — || align=right | 5.6 km || 
|-id=987 bgcolor=#d6d6d6
| 14987 ||  || — || October 26, 1997 || Oizumi || T. Kobayashi || THM || align=right | 7.7 km || 
|-id=988 bgcolor=#d6d6d6
| 14988 Tryggvason ||  ||  || October 25, 1997 || Kitt Peak || Spacewatch || — || align=right | 14 km || 
|-id=989 bgcolor=#E9E9E9
| 14989 Tutte ||  ||  || October 25, 1997 || Kitt Peak || Spacewatch || — || align=right | 7.0 km || 
|-id=990 bgcolor=#d6d6d6
| 14990 Zermelo ||  ||  || October 31, 1997 || Prescott || P. G. Comba || — || align=right | 5.6 km || 
|-id=991 bgcolor=#d6d6d6
| 14991 ||  || — || October 31, 1997 || Woomera || F. B. Zoltowski || — || align=right | 15 km || 
|-id=992 bgcolor=#d6d6d6
| 14992 ||  || — || October 26, 1997 || Nachi-Katsuura || Y. Shimizu, T. Urata || KOR || align=right | 6.5 km || 
|-id=993 bgcolor=#d6d6d6
| 14993 ||  || — || October 26, 1997 || Nachi-Katsuura || Y. Shimizu, T. Urata || — || align=right | 10 km || 
|-id=994 bgcolor=#d6d6d6
| 14994 Uppenkamp ||  ||  || October 28, 1997 || Kitt Peak || Spacewatch || 7:4 || align=right | 17 km || 
|-id=995 bgcolor=#d6d6d6
| 14995 Archytas ||  ||  || November 5, 1997 || Prescott || P. G. Comba || — || align=right | 16 km || 
|-id=996 bgcolor=#E9E9E9
| 14996 ||  || — || November 5, 1997 || Dynic || A. Sugie || — || align=right | 8.2 km || 
|-id=997 bgcolor=#d6d6d6
| 14997 ||  || — || November 1, 1997 || Kushiro || S. Ueda, H. Kaneda || KOR || align=right | 9.3 km || 
|-id=998 bgcolor=#d6d6d6
| 14998 Ogosemachi ||  ||  || November 1, 1997 || Kitami || K. Endate, K. Watanabe || KOR || align=right | 4.1 km || 
|-id=999 bgcolor=#E9E9E9
| 14999 ||  || — || November 9, 1997 || Nyukasa || M. Hirasawa, S. Suzuki || EUN || align=right | 9.0 km || 
|-id=000 bgcolor=#E9E9E9
| 15000 CCD ||  ||  || November 23, 1997 || Kitt Peak || Spacewatch || GEF || align=right | 3.6 km || 
|}

References

External links 
 Discovery Circumstances: Numbered Minor Planets (10001)–(15000) (IAU Minor Planet Center)

0014